Border control refers to measures taken by governments to monitor and regulate the movement of people, animals, and goods across land, air, and maritime borders. While border control is typically associated with international borders, it also encompasses controls imposed on internal borders within a single state.

Border control measures serve a variety of purposes, ranging from enforcing customs, sanitary and phytosanitary, or biosecurity regulations to restricting migration. While some borders (including most states' internal borders and international borders within the Schengen Area) are open and completely unguarded, others (including the vast majority of borders between countries as well as some internal borders) are subject to some degree of control and may be crossed legally only at designated checkpoints. Border controls in the 21st century are tightly intertwined with intricate systems of travel documents, visas, and increasingly complex policies that vary between countries.

History

States and rulers have always regarded the ability to determine who enters or remains in their territories as a key test of their sovereignty, but prior to World War I, border controls were only sporadically implemented. In medieval Europe, for example, the boundaries between rival countries and centres of power were largely symbolic or consisted of amorphous borderlands, 'marches', and 'debatable lands' of indeterminate or contested status and the real 'borders' consisted of the fortified walls that surrounded towns and cities, where the authorities could exclude undesirable or incompatible people at the gates, from vagrants, beggars and the 'wandering poor', to 'masterless women', lepers, Romani, or Jews.

The concept of border controls has its origins in antiquity. In Asia, the existence of border controls is evidenced in classical texts. The Arthashastra makes mention of passes issued at the rate of one masha per pass to enter and exit the country. Chapter 34 of the Second Book of Arthashastra concerns with the duties of the  who must issue sealed passes before a person could enter or leave the countryside. Passports resembling those issued today were an important part of the Chinese bureaucracy as early as the Western Han (202 BCE-220 CE), if not in the Qin Dynasty. They required such details as age, height, and bodily features. These passports (zhuan) determined a person's ability to move throughout imperial counties and through points of control. Even children needed passports, but those of one year or less who were in their mother's care may not have needed them.

In the medieval Islamic Caliphate, a form of passport was the bara'a, a receipt for taxes paid. Border controls were in place to ensure that only people who paid their zakah (for Muslims) or jizya (for dhimmis) taxes could travel freely between different regions of the Caliphate; thus, the bara'a receipt was a "basic passport".

In medieval Europe, passports were issued since at least the reign of Henry V of England, as a means of helping his subjects prove who they were in foreign lands. The earliest reference to these documents is found in a 1414 Act of Parliament. In 1540, granting travel documents in England became a role of the Privy Council of England, and it was around this time that the term "passport" was used. In 1794, issuing British passports became the job of the Office of the Secretary of State. The 1548 Imperial Diet of Augsburg required the public to hold imperial documents for travel, at the risk of permanent exile. During World War I, European governments introduced border passport requirements for security reasons, and to control the emigration of people with useful skills. These controls remained in place after the war, becoming a standard, though controversial, procedure. British tourists of the 1920s complained, especially about attached photographs and physical descriptions, which they considered led to a "nasty dehumanisation".

Starting in the mid-19th century, the Ottoman Empire established quarantine stations on many of its borders to control disease. For example, along the Greek-Turkish border, all travellers entering and exiting the Ottoman Empire would be quarantined for 9–15 days. These stations would often be manned by armed guards. If plague appeared, the Ottoman army would be deployed to enforce border control and monitor disease.

One of the earliest systematic attempts of modern nation states to implement border controls to restrict entry of particular groups were policies adopted by Canada, Australia, and America to curtail immigration of Asians in white settler states in the late 19th and early 20th centuries. The first anti-East Asian policy implemented in this era was the Chinese Exclusion Act of 1882 in America, which was followed suit by the Chinese Immigration Act of 1885 in Canada, which imposed what came to be called the Chinese head tax. These policies was a sign of injustice and unfair treatment to the Chinese workers because the jobs they engaged in were mostly menial jobs. Similar policies were adopted in various British colonies in Australia over the latter half of the 19th century targeting Asian immigrants arriving as a result of the region's series of gold rushes as well as Kanakas (Pacific Islanders brought into Australia as indentured labourers) who alongside the Asians were perceived by trade unionists and White blue collar workers as a threat to the wages of White settlers. Following the establishment of the Commonwealth of Australia in 1901, these discriminatory border control measures quickly expanded into the White Australia Policy, while subsequent legislation in America (e.g. the Immigration Act of 1891, the Naturalisation Act of 1906, and the Immigration Act of 1917) resulted in an even stricter policy targeting immigrants from both Asia and parts of southern and eastern Europe.

Even following the adoption of measures such as the White Australia Policy and the Chinese Exclusion Act in English-speaking settler colonies, pervasive control of international borders remained a relatively rare phenomenon until the early 20th century, prior to which many states had open international borders either in practice or due to a lack of any legal restriction. John Maynard Keynes identified World War I in particular as the point when such controls became commonplace.

Decolonisation during the twentieth century saw the emergence of mass emigration from nations in the Global South, thus leading former colonial occupiers to introduce stricter border controls. In the United Kingdom this process took place in stages, with British nationality law eventually shifting from recognising all Commonwealth citizens as British subjects to today's complex British nationality law which distinguishes between British citizens, modern British Subjects, British Overseas Citizens, and overseas nationals, with each non-standard category created as a result of attempts to balance border control and the need to mitigate statelessness. This aspect of the rise of border control in the 20th century has proven controversial. The British Nationality Law 1981 has been criticised by experts, as well as by the Committee on the Elimination of Racial Discrimination of the United Nations, on the grounds that the different classes of British nationality it created are, in fact, closely related to the ethnic origins of their holders.

The creation of British Nationality (Overseas) status, for instance, (with fewer privileges than British citizen status) was met with criticism from many Hong Kong residents who felt that British citizenship would have been more appropriate in light of the "moral debt" owed to them by the UK. Some British politicians and magazines also criticised the creation of BN(O) status. In 2020, the British government under Boris Johnson announced a programme under which BN(O)s would have leave to remain in the UK with rights to work and study for five years, after which they may apply for settled status. They would then be eligible for full citizenship after holding settled status for 12 months. This was implemented as the eponymously named "British National (Overseas) visa", a residence permit that BN(O)s and their dependent family members have been able to apply for since 31 January 2021. BN(O)s and their dependents who arrived in the UK before the new immigration route became available were granted "Leave Outside the Rules" at the discretion of the Border Force to remain in the country for up to six months as a temporary measure. In effect, this retroactively granted BN(O)s a path to right of abode in the United Kingdom. Despite the COVID-19 pandemic, about 7,000 people had entered the UK under this scheme between July 2020 and January 2021.

Ethnic tensions created during colonial occupation also resulted in discriminatory policies being adopted in newly independent African nations, such as Uganda under Idi Amin which banned Asians from Uganda, thus creating a mass exodus of the (largely Gujarati) Asian community of Uganda. Such ethnically driven border control policies took forms ranging from anti-Asian sentiment in East Africa to Apartheid policies in South Africa and Namibia (then known as Southwest Africa under South African rule) which created bantustans and pass laws to segregate and impose border controls against non-whites, and encouraged immigration of whites at the expense of Blacks as well as Indians and other Asians. Whilst border control in Europe and east of the Pacific have tightened over time, they have largely been liberalised in Africa, from Yoweri Museveni's reversal of Idi Amin's anti-Asian border controls to the fall of Apartheid (and thus racialised border controls) in South Africa.

The development of border control policies over the course of the 20th century also saw the standardisation of refugee travel documents under the Convention Relating to the Status of Refugees of 1951 and the 1954 Convention travel document for stateless people under the similar 1954 statelessness convention.

The COVID-19 pandemic in 2020 produced a drastic tightening of border controls across the globe. Many countries and regions have imposed quarantines, entry bans, or other restrictions for citizens of or recent travellers to the most affected areas. Other countries and regions have imposed global restrictions that apply to all foreign countries and territories, or prevent their own citizens from travelling overseas. The imposition of border controls has curtailed the spread of the virus, but because they were first implemented after community spread was established in multiple countries in different regions of the world, they produced only a modest reduction in the total number of people infected These strict border controls economic harm to the tourism industry through lost income and social harm to people who were unable to travel for family matters or other reasons. When the travel bans are lifted, many people are expected to resume traveling. However, some travel, especially business travel, may be decreased long-term as lower cost alternatives, such as teleconferencing and virtual events, are preferred. A possible long-term impact has been a decline of business travel and international conferencing, and the rise of their virtual, online equivalents. Concerns have been raised over the effectiveness of travel restrictions to contain the spread of COVID-19.

Aspects
Contemporary border control policies are complex and address a variety of distinct phenomena depending on the circumstances and political priorities of the state(s) implementing them. Consequently, there are several aspects of border control which vary in nature and importance from region to region.

Air and maritime borders
In addition to land borders, countries also apply border control measures to airspace and waters under their jurisdiction. Such measures control access to air and maritime territory as well as extractible resources (e.g. fish, minerals, fossil fuels).

Under the United Nations Convention on the Law of the Sea (UNCLOS), states exercise varying degrees of control over different categories of territorial waters:
 Internal waters: Waters landward of the baseline, over which the state has complete sovereignty: not even innocent passage is allowed without explicit permission from said state. Lakes and rivers are considered internal waters.
 Territorial sea: A state's territorial sea is a belt of coastal waters extending at most 22 kilometres from the baseline of a coastal state. If this would overlap with another state's territorial sea, the border is taken as the median point between the states' baselines, unless the states in question agree otherwise. A state can also choose to claim a smaller territorial sea. The territorial sea is regarded as the sovereign territory of the state, although foreign ships (military and civilian) are allowed innocent passage through it, or transit passage for straits; this sovereignty also extends to the airspace over and seabed below. As a result of UNCLOS, states exercise a similar degree of control over its territorial sea as over land territory and may thus utilise coast guard and naval patrols to enforce border control measures provided they do not prevent innocent or transit passage.
However, unlike the territorial sea, there is no standard rule for resolving such conflicts and the states in question must negotiate their own compromise. America invoked a contiguous zone out to 44 kilometres from the baseline on 29 September 1999.
A coastal nation has control of all economic resources within its exclusive economic zone, including fishing, mining, oil exploration, and any pollution of those resources. However, it cannot prohibit passage or loitering above, on, or under the surface of the sea that is in compliance with the laws and regulations adopted by the coastal State in accordance with the provisions of the UN Convention, within that portion of its exclusive economic zone beyond its territorial sea. The only authority a state has over its EEZ is therefore its ability to regulate the extraction or spoliation of resources contained therein and border control measures implemented to this effect focus on the suppression of unauthorised commercial activity.

Vessels not complying with a state's maritime policies may be subject to ship arrest and enforcement action by the state's authorities. Maritime border control measures are controversial in the context of international trade disputes, as was the case following France's detention of British fishermen in October 2021 in the aftermath of Brexit or when the Indonesian navy detained the crew of the Seven Seas Conqueress alleging that the vessel was unlawfully fishing within Indonesian territorial waters while the Singaporean government claimed the vessel was in Singaporean waters near Pedra Branca.

Similarly, international law accords each state control over the airspace above its land territory, internal waters, and territorial sea. Consequently, states have the authority to regulate flyover rights and tax foreign aircraft utilising their airspace. Additionally, the International Civil Aviation Organization designates states to administer international airspace, including airspace over waters not forming part of any state's territorial sea. Aircraft unlawfully entering a country's airspace may be grounded and their crews may be detained.

No country has sovereignty over international waters, including the associated airspace. All states have the freedom of fishing, navigation, overflight, laying cables and pipelines, as well as research. Oceans, seas, and waters outside national jurisdiction are also referred to as the high seas or, in Latin, mare liberum (meaning free sea). The 1958 Convention on the High Seas defined "high seas" to mean "all parts of the sea that are not included in the territorial sea or in the internal waters of a State" and where "no State may validly purport to subject any part of them to its sovereignty". Ships sailing the high seas are generally under the jurisdiction of their flag state (if there is one); however, when a ship is involved in certain criminal acts, such as piracy, any nation can exercise jurisdiction under the doctrine of universal jurisdiction regardless of maritime borders.

As part of their air and maritime border control policies, most countries restrict or regulate the ability of foreign airlines and vessels to transport of goods or passengers between sea ports and airports in their jurisdiction, known as cabotage. Restrictions on maritime cabotage apply exist in most countries with territorial and internal waters so as to protect the domestic shipping industry from foreign competition, preserve domestically owned shipping infrastructure for national security purposes, and ensure safety in congested territorial waters. For example, in America, the Jones Act provides for extremely strict restrictions on cabotage. Similarly, China does not permit foreign flagged vessels to conduct domestic transport or domestic transhipments without the prior approval of the Ministry of Transport. While Hong Kong and Macau maintain distinct internal cabotage regimes from the mainland, maritime cabotage between either territory and the mainland is considered domestic carriage and accordingly is off limits to foreign vessels. Similarly, maritime crossings across the Taiwan Strait requires special permits from both the People's Republic of China and the Republic of China and are usually off-limits to foreign vessels. In India, foreign vessels engaging in the coasting trade require a licence that is generally only issued when no local vessel is available. Similarly, a foreign vessel may only be issued a licence to engage in cabotage in Brazil if there are no Brazilian flagged vessels available for the intended transport.

As with maritime cabotage, most jurisdictions heavily restrict cabotage in passenger aviation, though rules regarding air cargo are typically more lax. Passenger cabotage is not usually granted under most open skies agreements. Air cabotage policies in the European Union are uniquely liberal insofar as carriers licensed by one member state are permitted to engage in cabotage in any EU member state, with few limitations. Chile has the most liberal air cabotage rules in the world, enacted in 1979, which allow foreign airlines to operate domestic flights, conditional upon reciprocal treatment for Chilean carriers in the foreign airline's country. Countries apply special provisions to the ability of foreign airlines to carry passengers between two domestic destinations through an offshore hub.

Many countries implement air defence identification zones (ADIZs) requiring aircraft approaching within a specified distance of its airspace to contact or seek prior authorisation from its military or transport authorities. An ADIZ may extend beyond a country's territory to give the country more time to respond to possibly hostile aircraft. The concept of an ADIZ is not defined in any international treaty and is not regulated by any international body, but is nevertheless a well-established aerial border control measure. Usually such zones only cover undisputed territory, do not apply to foreign aircraft not intending to enter territorial airspace, and do not overlap.

Biosecurity

Biosecurity refers to measures aimed at preventing the introduction and/or spread of harmful organisms (e.g. viruses, bacteria, etc.) to animals and plants in order to mitigate the risk of transmission of infectious disease. In agriculture, these measures are aimed at protecting food crops and livestock from pests, invasive species, and other organisms not conducive to the welfare of the human population. The term includes biological threats to people, including those from pandemic diseases and bioterrorism. The definition has sometimes been broadened to embrace other concepts, and it is used for different purposes in different contexts. The most common category of biosecurity policies are quarantine measures adopted to counteract the spread of disease and, when applied as a component of border control, focus primarily on mitigating the entry of infected individuals, plants, or animals into a country. Other aspects of biosecurity related to border control include mandatory vaccination policies for inbound travellers and measures to curtail the risk posed by bioterrorism or invasive species. Quarantine measures are frequently implemented with regard to the mobility of animals, including both pets and livestock. Notably, in order to reduce the risk of introducing rabies from continental Europe, the United Kingdom used to require that dogs, and most other animals introduced to the country, spend six months in quarantine at an HM Customs and Excise pound. This policy was abolished in 2000 in favour of a scheme generally known as Pet Passports, where animals can avoid quarantine if they have documentation showing they are up to date on their appropriate vaccinations.

In the past, quarantine measures were implemented by European countries in order to curtail the Bubonic Plague and Cholera. In the British Isles, for example, the Quarantine Act 1710 (9 Ann.) established maritime quarantine policies in an era in which strict border control measures as a whole were yet to become mainstream. The first act was called for due to fears that the plague might be imported from Poland and the Baltic states. The second act of 1721 was due to the prevalence of the plague at Marseille and other places in Provence, France. It was renewed in 1733 after a new outbreak in continental Europe, and again in 1743, due to an epidemic in Messina. In 1752 a rigorous quarantine clause was introduced into an act regulating trade with the Levant, and various arbitrary orders were issued during the next twenty years to meet the supposed danger of infection from the Baltic states. Although no plague cases ever came to England during that period, the restrictions on traffic became more stringent, and in 1788 a very strict Quarantine Act was passed, with provisions affecting cargoes in particular. The act was revised in 1801 and 1805, and in 1823–24 an elaborate inquiry was followed by an act making quarantine only at the discretion of the Privy Council, which recognised yellow fever or other highly infectious diseases as calling for quarantine, along with plague. The threat of cholera in 1831 was the last occasion in England of the use of quarantine restrictions. Cholera affected every country in Europe despite all efforts to keep it out. When cholera returned to England in 1849, 1853 and 1865–66, no attempt was made to seal the ports. In 1847 the privy council ordered all arrivals with a clean bill of health from the Black Sea and the Levant to be admitted, provided there had been no case of plague during the voyage and afterwards, the practice of quarantine was discontinued.

In modern maritime law, biosecurity measures for arriving vessels centre around 'pratique', a licence from border control officials permitting a ship to enter port on assurance from the captain that the vessel is free from contagious disease. The clearance granted is commonly referred to as 'free pratique'. A ship can signal a request for 'pratique' by flying a solid yellow square-shaped flag. This yellow flag is the Q flag in the set of international maritime signal flags. In the event that 'free pratique' is not granted, a vessel will be held in quarantine according to biosecurity rules prevailing at the port of entry until a border control officer inspects the vessel. During the COVID-19 pandemic, a controversy arose as to who granted pratique to the Ruby Princess. A related concept is the 'bill of health', a document issued by officials of a port of departure indicating to the officials of the port of arrival whether it is likely that the ship is carrying a contagious disease, either literally on board as fomites or via its crewmen or passengers. As defined in a consul's handbook from 1879:

Another category of biosecurity measures adopted by border control organisations is mandatory vaccination. As a result of the prevalence of Yellow Fever across much of the African continent, a significant portion of countries in the region require arriving passengers to present an International Certificate of Vaccination or Prophylaxis (Carte Jaune) certifying that they have received the Yellow Fever vaccine. A variety of other countries require travellers who have visited areas where Yellow Fever is endemic to present a certificate in order to clear border checkpoints as a means of preventing the spread of the disease. Prior to the emergence of COVID-19, Yellow Fever was the primary human disease subjected to de facto vaccine passport measures by border control authorities around the world. Similar measures are in place with regard to Polio and meningococcal meningitis in regions where those diseases are endemic and countries bordering those regions. Prior to the eradication of Smallpox, similar Carte Jaune requirements were in force for that disease around the world.

As a result of the COVID-19 pandemic, biosecurity measures have become a highly visible aspect of border control across the globe. Most notably, quarantine and mandatory COVID-19 vaccination for international travellers. Together with a decreased willingness to travel, the implementation of biosecurity measures has had a negative economic and social impact on the travel industry. Slow travel increased in popularity during the pandemic, with tourists visiting fewer destinations during their trips.

Biosecurity measures such as restrictions on cross-border travel, the introduction of mandatory vaccination for international travellers, and the adoption of quarantine or mandatory testing measures have helped to contain the spread of COVID-19. While test-based border screening measures may prove effective under certain circumstances, they may fail to detect a significant quantity positive cases if only conducted upon arrival without follow-up. A minimum 10-day quarantine may be beneficial in preventing the spread of COVID-19 and may be more effective if combined with an additional control measure like border screening. A study in Science found that travel restrictions could delay the initial arrival of COVID-19 in a country, but that they produced only modest overall effects unless combined with domestic infection prevention and control measures to considerably reduce transmissions. (This is consistent with prior research on influenza and other communicable diseases.) Travel bans early in the pandemic were most effective for isolated locations, such as small island nations.

During the COVID-19 pandemic, many jurisdictions across the globe introduced biosecurity measures on internal borders. This ranged from quarantine measures imposed upon individuals crossing state lines within America to prohibitions on interstate travel in Australia.

Customs

Each country has its own laws and regulations for the import and export of goods into and out of a country, which its customs authority enforces. The import or export of some goods may be restricted or forbidden, in which case customs controls enforce such policies. Customs enforcement at borders can also entail collecting excise tax and preventing the smuggling of dangerous or illegal goods. A customs duty is a tariff or tax on the importation (usually) or exportation (unusually) of goods.

In many countries, border controls for arriving passengers at many international airports and some road crossings are separated into red and green channels in order to prioritise customs enforcement. Within the European Union's common customs area, airports may operate additional blue channels for passengers arriving from within that area. For such passengers, border control may focus specifically on prohibited items and other goods that are not covered by the common policy. Luggage tags for checked luggage travelling within the EU are green-edged so they may be identified. In most EU member states, travellers coming from other EU countries within the Schengen Area can use the green lane, although airports outside the Schengen Area or with frequent flights arriving from jurisdictions within Schengen but outside the European Union may use blue channels for convenience and efficiency.

A customs area is an area designated for storage of commercial goods that have not cleared border controls. Commercial goods not yet cleared through customs are often stored in a type of customs area known as a bonded warehouse, until processed or re-exported. Ports authorised to handle international cargo generally include recognised bonded warehouses. For the purpose of customs duties, goods within the customs area are treated as being outside the country. This allows easy transshipment to a third country without customs authorities being involved. For this reason, customs areas are usually carefully controlled and fenced to prevent smuggling. However, the area is still territorially part of the country, so the goods within the area are subject to other local laws (for example drug laws and biosecurity regulations), and thus may be searched, impounded or turned back. The term is also sometimes used to define an area (usually composed of several countries) which form a customs union, a customs territory, or to describe the area at airports and ports where travellers are checked through customs.

Sanitary and phytosanitary (SPS) measures are customs measures to protect humans, animals, and plants from diseases, pests, or contaminants. The Agreement on the Application of Sanitary and Phytosanitary Measures, concluded at the Uruguay Round of the Multilateral Trade Negotiations, establishes the types of SPS measures each jurisdiction is permitted to impose. Examples of SPS are tolerance limits for residues, restricted use of substances, labelling requirements related to food safety, hygienic requirements and quarantine requirements. In certain countries, sanitary and phytosanitary measures focuses extensively on curtailing and regulating the import of foreign agricultural products in order to protect domestic ecosystems. For example, Australian border controls restrict most (if not all) food products, certain wooden products and other similar items. Similar restrictions exist in Canada, America and New Zealand.

Border control in many countries in Asia and the Americas prioritises enforcing customs laws pertaining to narcotics. For instance, India and Malaysia are focusing resources on eliminating drug smuggling from Myanmar and Thailand respectively. The issue stems largely from the high output of dangerous and illegal drugs in the Golden Triangle as well as in regions further west such as Afghanistan. A similar problem exists east of the Pacific, and has resulted in countries such as Mexico and the United States tightening border control in response to the northward flow of illegal substances from regions such as Colombia. The Mexican Drug War and similar cartel activity in neighbouring areas has exacerbated the problem. In certain countries illegal importing, exporting, sale, or possession of drugs constitute capital offences and may result in a death sentence. A March 2018 report by Harm Reduction International says: "There are at least 33 countries and territories that prescribe the death penalty for drug offences in law. ... Between January 2015 and December 2017, at least 1,320 people are known to have been executed for drug-related offences - 718 in 2015; 325 in 2016; and 280 in 2017." A 2015 article by The Economist says that the laws of 32 countries provide for capital punishment for drug smuggling, but only in six countries – China, Iran, Saudi Arabia, Vietnam, Malaysia, and Singapore –are drug offenders known to be routinely executed. Additionally, Singapore, Malaysia, and Indonesia impose mandatory death sentences on individuals caught smuggling restricted substances across their borders. For example, Muhammad Ridzuan Ali was executed in Singapore on 19 May 2017 for drug trafficking. According to a 2011 article by the Lawyers Collective, an NGO in India, "32 countries impose capital punishment for offences involving narcotic drugs and psychotropic substances." South Korean law provides for capital punishment for drug offences, but South Korea has a de facto moratorium on capital punishment as there have been no executions since 1997, even though there are still people on death row and new death sentences continue to be handed down.

Border security
 
Border security refers to measures taken by one or more governments to enforce their border control policies. Such measures target a variety of issues, ranging from customs violations and trade in unlawful goods to the suppression of unauthorised migration or travel. The specific border security measures taken by a jurisdiction vary depending on the priorities of local authorities and are affected by social, economic, and geographical factors.

In India, which maintains free movement with Nepal and Bhutan, border security focuses primarily on the Bangladeshi, Pakistani, and Myanmar borders. India's primary focus with regard to the border with Bangladesh is to deter unlawful immigration and drug trafficking. On the Pakistani border, the Border Security Force aims to prevent the infiltration of Indian territory by terrorists from Pakistan and other countries in the west (Afghanistan, Iraq, Syria, etc.). In contrast, India's border with Myanmar is porous and the 2021 military coup in Myanmar saw an influx of refugees seeking asylum in border states including Mizoram. The refoulement of Rohingya refugees is a contentious aspect of India's border control policy vis à vis Myanmar.

Meanwhile, American border security policy is largely centred on the country's border with Mexico. Security along this border is composed of many distinct elements; including physical barriers, patrol routes, lighting, and border patrol personnel. In contrast, the border with Canada is primarily composed of joint border patrol and security camera programmes, forming the longest undefended border in the world. In remote areas along the border with Canada, where staffed border crossings are not available, there are hidden sensors on roads, trails, railways, and wooded areas, which are located near crossing points.

Border security on the Schengen Area's external borders is especially restrictive. Members of the Schengen Agreement are required to apply strict checks on travellers entering and exiting the area. These checks are co-ordinated by the European Union's Frontex agency, and subject to common rules. The details of border controls, surveillance and the conditions under which permission to enter into the Schengen Area may be granted are exhaustively detailed in the Schengen Borders Code. All persons crossing external borders—inbound or outbound—are subject to a check by a border guard. The only exception is for regular cross-border commuters (both those with the right of free movement and third-country nationals) who are well known to the border guards: once an initial check has shown that there is no alert on record relating to them in the Schengen Information System or national databases, they can only be subject to occasional 'random' checks, rather than systematic checks every time they cross the border. Additionally, border security in Europe is increasingly being outsourced to private companies, with the border security market growing at a rate of 7% per year. In its Border Wars series, the Transnational Institute showed that the arms and security industry helps shape European border security policy through lobbying, regular interactions with EU's border institutions and its shaping of research policy. The institute criticises the border security industry for having a vested interest in increasing border militarisation in order to increase profits. Furthermore, the same companies are also often involved in the arms trade and thus profit twice: first from fuelling the conflicts, repression and human rights abuses that have led refugees to flee their homes and later from intercepting them along their migration routes.

Border walls
Border walls are a common aspect of border security measures across the world. Border walls generally seek to limit unauthorised travel across an international border and are frequently implemented as a populist response to refugees and economic migrants.

It's stated aim is to limit unauthorised migration. The project has run into several delays and there is no clear completion date for the project yet. Similar to India's barrier with Bangladesh and the proposed wall between America and Mexico, Iran has constructed a wall on its frontier with Pakistan. The wall aims to reduce unauthorised border crossings and stem the flow of drugs, and is also a response to terrorist attacks, notably the one in the Iranian border town of Zahedan on 17 February 2007, which killed thirteen people, including nine Iranian Revolutionary Guard officials. Former president Donald Trump's proposal to build a new wall along the border formed a major feature of his 2016 presidential campaign and, over the course of his presidency, his administration spent approximately US$15 billion on the project, with US$5 billion appropriated from US Customs and Border Protection, US$6.3 billion appropriated from anti-narcotics initiative funded by congress, and US$3.6 billion appropriated from the American military. Members of both the Democratic and Republican parties who opposed Trump's border control policies regarded the border wall as unnecessary or undesirable, arguing that other measures would be more effective at reducing illegal immigration than building a wall, including tackling the economic issues that lead to immigration being a relevant issue altogether, border surveillance or an increase in the number of customs agents. Additionally, in August 2020, the United States constructed 3.8 km of short cable fencing along the border between Abbotsford, British Columbia, and Whatcom County, Washington.

Border walls have formed a major component of European border control policy following the European migrant crisis. The walls at Melilla and at Ceuta on Spain's border with Morocco are designed to curtail the ability of refugees and migrants to enter the European Union via the two Spanish cities on the Moroccan coast. Similar measures have been taken on the Schengen area's borders with Turkey in response to the refugee crisis created in Syria by terrorist organisations such as Daesh and the Syrian Free Army. The creation of European Union's collective border security organisation, Frontex, is another aspect of the bloc's growing focus on border security. Within the Schengen Area, border security has become an especially prominent priority for the Hungarian government under right-wing strongman Viktor Orbán. Similarly, Saudi Arabia has begun construction of a border barrier or fence between its territory and Yemen to prevent the unauthorized movement of people and goods. The difference between the countries' economic situations means that many Yemenis head to Saudi Arabia to find work. Saudi Arabia does not have a barrier with its other neighbours in the Gulf Cooperation Council, whose economies are more similar. In 2006 Saudi Arabia proposed constructing a security fence along the entire length of its 900 kilometre long desert border with Iraq. As of July 2009 it was reported that Saudis will pay $3.5 billion for a security fence. Elsewhere in Europe, the Republic of Macedonia began erecting a fence on its border with Greece in November 2015.

The official reason for the fence is to stop the spread of foot-and-mouth disease among livestock. Zimbabweans argue that the height of the fence is clearly intended to keep out people. Botswana has responded that the fence is designed to keep out cattle, and to ensure that entrants have their shoes disinfected at legal border crossings. Botswana also argued that the government continues to encourage legal movement into the country. Zimbabwe was unconvinced, and the barrier remains a source of tension.

Border checkpoints

A Border checkpoint is a place where goods or individuals moving across borders are inspected for compliance with border control measures. Access-controlled borders often have a limited number of checkpoints where they can be crossed without legal sanctions. Arrangements or treaties may be formed to allow or mandate less restrained crossings (e.g. the Schengen Agreement). Land border checkpoints (land ports of entry) can be contrasted with the customs and immigration facilities at seaports, international airports, and other ports of entry.

Checkpoints generally serve two purposes:
 To prevent entrance of individuals who are either undesirable (e.g. criminals or others who pose threats) or simply unauthorised to enter.
 To prevent entrance of goods or contaminants that are illegal or subject to restriction, or to collect tariffs in accordance with customs or quarantine policies.

A border checkpoint at which travellers are permitted to enter a jurisdiction is known as a port of entry. International airports are usually ports of entry, as are road and rail crossings on a land border. Seaports can be used as ports of entry only if a dedicated customs presence is posted there. The choice of whether to become a port of entry is up to the civil authority controlling the port. An airport of entry is an airport that provides customs and immigration services for incoming flights. These services allow the airport to serve as an initial port of entry for foreign visitors arriving in a country. While the terms airport of entry and international airport are generally used interchangeably, not all international airports qualify as airports of entry since international airports without any immigration or customs facilities exist in the Schengen Area whose members have eliminated border controls with each other. Airports of entry are usually larger than domestic airports and often feature longer runways and facilities to accommodate the heavier aircraft commonly used for international and intercontinental travel. International airports often also host domestic flights, which often help feed both passengers and cargo into international ones (and vice versa). Buildings, operations and management have become increasingly sophisticated since the mid-20th century, when international airports began to provide infrastructure for international civilian flights. Detailed technical standards have been developed to ensure safety and common coding systems implemented to provide global consistency. The physical structures that serve millions of individual passengers and flights are among the most complex and interconnected in the world.

Border inspections are also meant to protect each country's agriculture from pests. National and international phytosanitary authorities maintain databases of border interceptions, occurrences, and establishments. Bebber et al., 2019 analyses such records and finds that they underreport many important pest species, that island nations are more vulnerable because they have lower border-to-area ratios, and that pests are moving poleward to follow humans' crops as our crops follow global warming.

A 'Quilantan' or 'Wave Through' entry is a phenomenon at American border checkpoints authorising a form of non-standard but legal entry without any inspection of travel documents. It occurs when the border security personnel present at a border crossing choose to summarily admit some number of persons without performing a standard interview or document examination. If an individual can prove that they were waved through immigration in this manner, then they are considered to have entered with inspection despite not having answered any questions or received a passport entry stamp. This definition of legal entry only extends to foreigners who entered America at official border crossings and does not provide a path to legal residency for those who did not enter through a recognised crossing.

Border zones

Border zones are areas near borders that have special restrictions on movement. Governments may forbid unauthorised entry to or exit from border zones and restrict property ownership in the area. The zones function as buffer zones specifically monitored by border patrols in order to prevent unauthorised cross-border travel. Border zones enable authorities to detain and prosecute individuals suspected of being or aiding undocumented migrants, smugglers, or spies without necessarily having to prove that the individuals in question actually engaged in the suspected unauthorised activity since, as all unauthorised presence in the area is forbidden, the mere presence of an individual permits authorities to arrest them. Border zones between hostile states can be heavily militarised, with minefields, barbed wire, and watchtowers. Some border zones are designed to prevent illegal immigration or emigration and do not have many restrictions but may operate checkpoints to check immigration status. In most places, a border vista is usually included and/or required. In some nations, movement inside a border zone without a licence is an offence and will result in arrest. No probable cause is required as mere presence inside the zone is an offence, if it is intentional. Even with a licence to enter, photography, making fires, and carrying of firearms and hunting are prohibited.

Examples of international border zones are the Border Security Zone of Russia and the Finnish border zone on the Finnish–Russian border. There are also intra-country zones such as the Cactus Curtain surrounding the Guantanamo Bay Naval Base in Cuba, the Korean Demilitarised Zone along the North Korea-South Korea demarcation line and the Frontier Closed Area in Hong Kong. Important historical examples are the Wire of Death set up by the German Empire to control the Belgium–Netherlands border and the Iron Curtain, a set of border zones maintained by the Soviet Union and its satellite states along their borders with Western states. One of the most militarised parts was the restricted zone of the inner German border. While initially and officially the zone was for border security, eventually it was engineered to prevent escape from the Soviet sphere into the West. Ultimately, the Eastern Bloc governments resorted to using lethal countermeasures against those trying to cross the border, such as mined fences and orders to shoot anyone trying to cross into the West. The restrictions on building and habitation made the area a "green corridor", today established as the European Green Belt.

In the area stretching inwards from its internal border with the mainland, Hong Kong maintains a Frontier Closed Area out of bounds to those without special authorisation. The area was established in the 1950s when Hong Kong was under British administration as a consequence of the Convention for the Extension of Hong Kong Territory prior to the Transfer of sovereignty over Hong Kong in 1997. The purposes of the area were to prevent illegal immigration and smuggling; smuggling had become prevalent as a consequence of the Korean War. Today, under the one country, two systems policy, the area continues to be used to curtail unauthorised migration to Hong Kong and the smuggling of goods in either direction.

As a result of the partition of the Korean peninsula by America and the Soviet Union after World War II, and exacerbated by the subsequent Korean War, there is a Demilitarised Zone (DMZ) spanning the de facto border between North and South Korea. The DMZ follows the effective boundaries as of the end of the Korean War in 1953. Similarly to the Frontier Closed Area in Hong Kong, this zone and the defence apparatus that exists on both sides of the border serve to curtail unauthorised passage between the two sides. In South Korea, there is an additional fenced-off area between the Civilian Control Line (CCL) and the start of the Demilitarised Zone. Its purpose is to limit and control the entrance of civilians into the area in order to protect and maintain the security of military facilities and operations near the Demilitarised Zone. The commander of the 8th US Army ordered the creation of the CCL and it was activated and first became effective in February 1954. The buffer zone that falls south of the Southern Limit Line is called the Civilian Control Zone. Barbed wire fences and manned military guard posts mark the CCLe. South Korean soldiers typically accompany tourist busses and cars travelling north of the CCL as armed guards to monitor the civilians as well as to protect them from North Korean intruders. Most of the tourist and media photos of the "Demilitarised Zone fence" are actually photos of the CCL fence. The actual Demilitarised Zone fence on the Southern Limit Line is completely off-limits to everybody except soldiers and it is illegal to take pictures of the Demilitarised Zone fence.

Similarly, the whole estuary of the Han River in the Korean Peninsula is deemed a "Neutral Zone" and is officially off-limits to all civilian vessels. Only military vessels are allowed within this neutral zone. In recent years, Chinese fishing vessels have taken advantage of the tense situation in the Han River Estuary Neutral Zone and illegally fished in this area due to both North Korean and South Korean navies never patrolling this area due to the fear of naval battles breaking out. This has led to firefights and sinkings of boats between Chinese fishermen and South Korean Coast Guard. On January 30, 2019, North Korean and South Korean military officials signed a landmark agreement that would open the Han River Estuary to civilian vessels for the first time since the Armistice Agreement in 1953. The agreement was scheduled to take place in April 2019 but the failure of the 2019 Hanoi Summit indefinitely postponed these plans.

The Green Line separating Southern Cyprus and Northern Cyprus is a demilitarised border zone operated by the United Nations Peacekeeping Force in Cyprus operate and patrol within the buffer zone. The buffer zone was established in 1974 due to ethnic tensions between Greek and Turkish Cypriots. The green line is similar in nature to the 38th parallel separating the Republic of Korea and North Korea.

Some border zones, referred to as border vistas, are composed of legally mandated cleared space between two areas of foliage located at an international border intended to provide a clear demarcation line between two jurisdictions. Border vistas are most commonly found along undefended international boundary lines, where border security is not as much of a necessity and a built barrier is undesired, and are a treaty requirement for certain borders. An example of a border vista is a  cleared space around unguarded portions of the Canada–United States border. Similar clearings along the border line are provided for by many international treaties. For example, the 2006 border management treaty between Russia and China provides for a  cleared strip along the two nations' border.

Immigration law and policy

Immigration law refers to the national statutes, regulations, and legal precedents governing immigration into and deportation from a country. Strictly speaking, it is distinct from other matters such as naturalisation and citizenship, although they are often conflated. Immigration laws vary around the world, as well as according to the social and political climate of the times, as acceptance of immigrants sways from the widely inclusive to the deeply nationalist and isolationist. Countries frequently maintain laws which regulate both the rights of entry and exit as well as internal rights, such as the duration of stay, freedom of movement, and the right to participate in commerce or government. National laws regarding the immigration of citizens of that country are regulated by international law. While the United Nations' International Covenant on Civil and Political Rights mandates that all countries allow entry to their own citizens, this principle is not always respected in practice. For instance, during the COVID-19 pandemic, Australia adopted a policy of denying entry to all individuals in particularly affected jurisdictions, including Australian citizens and permanent residents. Similarly, while states within the Schengen Area typically permit freedom of movement across borders, many states within the area implemented ad hoc border controls during the pandemic.

Immigration policy is the aspect of border control concerning the transit of people into a country, especially those that intend to stay and work in the country. Taxation, tariff and trade rules set out what goods immigrants may bring with them, and what services they may perform while temporarily in the country. Agricultural policy may make exemptions for migrant farm workers, who typically enter a country only for the harvest season and then return home to a country or region in the Global South (such as Mexico or Jamaica from where U.S. and Canada, respectively, often import temporary agricultural labour). An important aspect of immigration policy is the treatment of refugees, more or less helpless or stateless people who throw themselves on the mercy of the state they try to enter, seeking refuge from actual or purported poor treatment in their country of origin. Asylum is sometimes granted to those who face persecution or a well-founded fear of persecution on account of race, religion, nationality, membership of a particular social group, or political opinion.

As a result of investment-oriented immigration policies, states sometimes implement border control measures known as immigrant investor programmes that offer permanent residence or citizenship in return for investment. Immigrant investor programmes originated in the 1980s when tax havens in the Pacific and Caribbean began "cash-for-passport" programmes that facilitated visa-free travel and tax avoidance. Such programmes have sparked controversy in several countries. A lack of demonstrable economic benefits, and security concerns, have been among the most common criticisms. In 2014 the Canadian government suspended their golden visa programme (although, as of 2017, Quebec maintains its own golden visa programme). The implementation of such programmes in Europe has been criticised by the European Parliament, which approved a non-binding resolution that in 2014 declaring that an EU passport, which by definition provides its bearer the right to reside in any EU or EEA jurisdiction, should not have a "price tag".

Diaspora communities

Certain countries adopt immigration policies designed to be favourable towards members of diaspora communities with a connection to the country. For example, the Indian government confers Overseas Citizenship of India (OCI) status on foreign citizens of Indian origin to live and work indefinitely in India. OCI status was introduced in response to demands for dual citizenship by the Indian diaspora, particularly in countries with large populations of Indian origin. It was introduced by The Citizenship (Amendment) Act, 2005 in August 2005. Similar to OCI status, the UK Ancestry visa exempts members of the British diaspora from usual immigration controls, while Poland issues the Karta Polaka to citizens of certain northeast European countries with Polish ancestry.

Some nations recognise a right of return for people with ancestry in that country or a connection to a particular ethnic group. A notable example of this is the right of Sephardi Jews to acquire Spanish nationality by virtue of their community's Spanish origins. Similar exemptions to immigration controls exist for people of Armenian origin seeking to acquire Armenian citizenship. Ghana, similarly, grants an indefinite right to stay in Ghana to members of the African diaspora regardless of citizenship. Similarly, Israel maintains a policy permitting members of the Jewish diaspora to immigrate to Israel regardless of prior nationality.

South Korean immigration policy is relatively unique in that, as a consequence of its claim over the territory currently administered by North Korea, citizens of North Korea are regarded by the South as its own citizens by birth. Consequently, North Korean refugees in China often attempt to travel to countries such as Thailand which, while not offering asylum to North Koreans, classifies them as unauthorised immigrants and deports them to South Korea instead of North Korea. At the same time, this policy has operated to prevent pro-North Korea Zainichi Koreans recognised by Japan as Chōsen-seki from entering South Korea without special permission from the South Korean authorities as, despite being regarded as citizens of the Republic of Korea and members of the Korean diaspora, they generally refuse to exercise that status.

Open borders

An open border is the deregulation and or lack of regulation on the movement of persons between nations and jurisdictions, this does not apply to trade or movement between privately owned land areas. Most nations have open borders for travel within their nation of travel, though more authoritarian states may limit the freedom of internal movement of its citizens, as for example in the former USSR. However, only a handful of nations have deregulated open borders with other nations, an example of this being European countries under the Schengen Agreement or the open Belarus-Russia border. Open borders used to be very common among all nations, however this became less common after the First World War, which led to the regulation of open borders, making them less common and no longer feasible for most industrialised nations.

Open borders are the norm for borders between subdivisions within the boundaries of sovereign states, though some countries do maintain internal border controls (for example between the People's Republic of China mainland and the special administrative regions of Hong Kong and Macau; or between the American mainland, the unincorporated territories other than Puerto Rico, and Hawaii. Open borders are also usual between member states of federations, though (very rarely) movement between member states may be controlled in exceptional circumstances. Federations, confederations and similar multi-national unions typically maintain external border controls through a collective border control system, though they sometimes have open borders with other non-member states through special international agreements such as between Schengen Agreement countries as mentioned above.

Presently, open border agreements of various types are in force in several areas around the world, as outlined below:
 Asia and Oceania:
 Under the 1950 Indo-Nepal Treaty of Peace and Friendship, India and Nepal maintain a similar arrangement to the CTA and the Union State. Indians and Nepalis are not subject to any migration controls in each other's countries and there are few controls on land travel by citizens across the border.
 India and Bhutan also have a similar programme in place The border between Jaigaon, in the Indian state of West Bengal, and the city of Phuentsholing is essentially open, and although there are internal checkpoints, Indians (as outlined under the Visa policy of Bhutan are allowed to proceed throughout Bhutan with a voter's ID or an identity slip from the Indian consulate in Phuentsholing. Similarly, Bhutanese passport holders enjoy free movement in India.
 Thailand and Cambodia: Whilst not as liberal as the policies concerning the Indo-Nepalese and Indo-Bhutanese borders, Thailand and Cambodia have begun issuing combined visas to certain categories of tourists applying at specific Thai or Cambodian embassies and consulates in order to enable freer border crossings between the two countries. The policy is currently in force for nationals of America and several European (primarily EU, EEA, and GCC) and Oceanian countries as well as for Indian and Chinese nationals residing in Singapore.
 Australia and New Zealand: Similar to the agreement between India and Nepal, Trans-Tasman Travel Arrangement between Australia and New Zealand is a free movement agreement citizens of each country to travel freely between them and allowing citizens and some permanent residents to reside, visit, work, study in the other country for an indefinite period, with some restrictions. The arrangement came into effect in 1973, and allows citizens of each country to reside and work in the other country, with some restrictions. Other details of the arrangement have varied over time. From 1 July 1981, all people entering Australia (including New Zealand citizens) have been required to carry a passport. Since 1 September 1994 Australia, has had a universal visa requirement, and to specifically cater for the continued free movement of New Zealanders to Australia, the Special Category Visa was introduced for New Zealanders.
 Central America :The Central America-4 Border Control Agreement abolishes border controls for land travel between El Salvador, Honduras, Nicaragua, and Guatemala. However, this does not apply to air travel.
 Europe and the Middle East
 Union State of Russia and Belarus The Union State of Russia and Belarus is a supranational union of Russia and Belarus, which eliminates all border controls between the two nations. Before a visa agreement was signed in 2020, each country maintained its own visa policies, thus resulting in non-citizens of the two countries generally being barred from travelling directly between the two. However, since the visa agreement was signed, each side recognises the other's visas, which means that third-country citizens can enter both countries with a visa from either country.
 Western Europe: The two most significant free travel areas in Western Europe are the Schengen Area, in which very little if any border control is generally visible, and the Common Travel Area (CTA), which partially eliminates such controls for nationals of the United Kingdom and Ireland. Between countries in the Schengen Area, and to an extent within the CTA on the British Isles, internal border control is often virtually unnoticeable, and often only performed by means of random car or train searches in the hinterland, while controls at borders with non-member states may be rather strict.
 Gulf Cooperation Council: Members of the Gulf Cooperation Council, or GCC, allow each other's citizens freedom of movement in an arrangement similar to the CTA and to that between India and Nepal. Between 5 June 2017 and 5 January 2021, freedom of movement in Saudi Arabia, the UAE, and Bahrain was suspended for Qataris as a result of the Saudi-led blockade of the country.

Hostile environment policies

Certain jurisdictions gear their immigration policies toward creating a hostile environment for undocumented migrants in order to deter migration by creating an unwelcoming atmosphere for potential and existing immigrants. Notably, the British Home Office adopted a set of administrative and legislative measures designed to make staying in the United Kingdom as difficult as possible for people without leave to remain, in the hope that they may "voluntarily leave". The Home Office policy was first announced in 2012 under the Conservative-Liberal Democrat coalition. The policy was implemented pursuant to the 2010 Conservative Party Election Manifesto. The policy has been criticised for being unclear, has led to many incorrect threats of deportation and has been called "Byzantine" by the England and Wales Court of Appeal for its complexity.

Similarly, anti-immigration movements in America have advocated for policies aimed at creating a hostile environment for intended and existing immigrants at various points in history. Historical examples include the nativist Know Nothing movement of the mid-19th century, which advocated hostile policies against Catholic immigrants; the Workingman's Party, which promoted xenophobic attitudes toward Asians in California during the late-19th century, a sentiment that ultimately led to the Chinese Exclusion Act of 1882; the Immigration Restriction League, which advocated xenophobic policies against southern and eastern Europe during the late-19th and early 20th centuries, and the joint congressional Dillingham Commission. Following World War I, these cumulatively resulted in the highly restrictive Emergency Quota Act of 1921 and the Immigration Act of 1924. Over the first two decades of the 20th century, the Republican Party adopted an increasingly nativist platform, advocating against sanctuary cities and in favour of building a wall with Mexico and reducing the number of immigrants permitted to settle in the country. Ultimately, the Trump administration furthered many of these policy goals, including the adoption of harsh policies such as the Remain in Mexico and family separation policies vis à vis refugees and migrants arriving from Central America via Mexico. Islamophobic policies such as the travel ban targeted primarily at Muslim-majority countries also feature prominently in attempts to create a hostile environment for immigrants perceived by populists as not belonging to the predominant WASP culture in the United States.

India's citizenship registration policy serves to create a hostile environment for the country's Muslim community in the regions in which it has been implemented. The Indian government is presently in the process of building several detention camps throughout India in order to detain people not listed on the register. On 9 January 2019, the Union government released a '2019 Model Detention Manual', which stated that every city or district, having a major immigration check post, must have a detention centre.

International zones

An international zone is any area not fully subject to the border control policies of the state in which it is located. There are several types of international zones ranging from special economic zones and sterile zones at ports of entry exempt from customs rules to concessions over which administration is ceded to one or more foreign states. International zones may also maintain distinct visa policies from the rest of the surrounding state.

Internal border controls

Internal border controls are measures implemented to control the flow of people or goods within a given country. Such measures take a variety of forms ranging from the imposition of border checkpoints to the issuance of internal travel documents and vary depending on the circumstances in which they are implemented. Circumstances resulting in internal border controls include increasing security around border areas (e.g. internal checkpoints in America or Bhutan near border regions), preserving the autonomy of autonomous or minority areas (e.g. border controls between Peninsular Malaysia, Sabah, and Sarawak; border controls between Hong Kong, Macau, and mainland China), preventing unrest between ethnic groups (e.g. Northern Ireland's peace walls, border controls in Tibet and Northeastern India), and disputes between rival governments (e.g. between the Republic of China and the People's Republic of China).

During the COVID-19 pandemic, temporary internal border controls were introduced in jurisdictions across the globe. For instance, travel between Australian states and territories was prohibited or restricted by state governments at various points of the pandemic either in conjunction with sporadic lockdowns or as a stand-alone response to COVID-19 outbreaks in neighbouring states. Internal border controls were also introduced at various stages of Malaysia's Movement Control Order, per which interstate travel was restricted depending on the severity of ongoing outbreaks. Similarly, internal controls were introduced by national authorities within the Schengen Area, though the European Union ultimately rejected the idea of suspending the Schengen Agreement per se.

Asia
Internal border controls exist in many parts of Asia. For example, travellers visiting minority regions in India and China often require special permits to enter. Internal air and rail travel within non-autonomous portions of India and mainland China also generally require travel documents to be checked by government officials as a form of the interior border checkpoint. For such travel within India, Indian citizens may utilise their Voter ID, National Identity Card, passport, or other proof of Indian citizenship whilst Nepali nationals may present any similar proof of Napali citizenship. Meanwhile, for such travel within mainland China, Chinese nationals from the mainland are required to use their national identity cards.

Within China, extensive border controls are maintained for those travelling between the mainland, special administrative regions of Hong Kong and Macau. Foreign nationals need to present their passports or other required types of travel documents when travelling between these jurisdictions. For Chinese nationals (including those with British National (Overseas) status), there are special documents for travel between these territories. Internal border controls in China have also resulted in the creation of special permits allowing Chinese citizens to immigrate to or reside in other immigration areas within the country.

China also maintains distinct, relaxed border control policies in the Special Economic Zones of Shenzhen, Zhuhai and Xiamen. Nationals of most countries can obtain a limited area visa upon arrival in these regions, which permit them to stay within these cities without proceeding further into other parts of Mainland China. Visas for Shenzhen are valid for 5 days, and visas for Xiamen and Zhuhai are valid for 3 days. The duration of stay starts from the next day of arrival. The visa can only be obtained only upon arrival at Luohu Port, Huanggang Port Control Point, Fuyong Ferry Terminal or Shekou Passenger Terminal for Shenzhen; Gongbei Port of Entry, Hengqin Port or Jiuzhou Port for Zhuhai; and Xiamen Gaoqi International Airport for Xiamen.

Similarly, China permits nationals of non—visa-exempt ASEAN countries to visit Guilin without a visa for a maximum of 6 days if they travel with an approved tour group and enter China from Guilin Liangjiang International Airport. They may not visit other cities within Guangxi or other parts of Mainland China.

Neither the People's Republic of China nor the Republic of China recognizes the passports issued by the other and neither considers travel between mainland China and areas controlled by the Republic of China
as formal international travel. There are arrangements exist for travel between territories controlled by the Republic of China and territories controlled by the People's Republic of China. 

Meanwhile, in Bhutan, a microstate accessible by road only through India, there are interior border checkpoints (primarily on the Lateral Road) and, additionally, certain areas require special permits to enter, whilst visitors not proceeding beyond the border city of Phuentsholing do not need permits to enter for the day (although such visitors are de facto subject to Indian visa policy since they must proceed through Jaigaon). Individuals who are not citizens of India, Bangladesh, or the Maldives must obtain both their visa and any regional permits required through a licensed tour operator prior to arriving in the country. Citizens of India, Bangladesh, and the Maldives may apply for regional permits for restricted areas online.

More generally, authorities in mainland China maintain a system of residency registration known as hukou, by which government permission is needed to formally change one's place of residence. It is enforced with identity cards. This system of internal border control measures effectively limited internal migration before the 1980s but subsequent market reforms caused it to collapse as a means of migration control. An estimated 150 to 200 million people are part of the "blind flow" and have unofficially migrated, generally from poor, rural areas to wealthy, urban ones. However, unofficial residents are often denied official services such as education and medical care and are sometimes subject to both social and political discrimination. In essence, the denial of social services outside an individual's registered area of residence functions as an internal border control measure geared toward dissuading migration within the mainland.

Another example is the Malaysian states of Sabah and Sarawak, which have maintained their own border controls since joining Malaysia in 1963. The internal border control is asymmetrical; while Sabah and Sarawak impose immigration control on Malaysian citizens from other states, there is no corresponding border control in Peninsular Malaysia, and Malaysians from Sabah and Sarawak have unrestricted right to live and work in the Peninsular. For social and business visits less than three months, Malaysian citizens may travel between the Peninsular, Sabah and Sarawak using the Malaysian identity card (MyKad) or Malaysian passport, while for longer stays in Sabah and Sarawak they are required to have an Internal Travel Document or a passport with the appropriate residential permit.

The most restrictive internal border controls are in North Korea. Citizens are not allowed to travel outside their areas of residence without explicit authorisation, and access to the capital city of Pyongyang is heavily restricted. Similar restrictions are imposed on tourists, who are only allowed to leave Pyongyang on government-authorised tours to approved tourist sites.

Europe
An example from Europe is the implementation of border controls on travel between Svalbard, which maintains a policy of free migration as a result of the Svalbard Treaty and the Schengen Area, which includes the rest of Norway. Other examples of effective internal border controls in Europe include the closed cities of certain CIS members, areas of Turkmenistan that require special permits to enter, restrictions on travel to the Gorno-Badakhshan Autonomous Region in Tajikistan, and (depending on whether Northern and Southern Cyprus are considered separate countries) the Cypriot border. Similarly, Iraq's Kurdistan region maintains a separate and more liberal visa and customs area from the rest of the country, even allowing visa free entry for Israelis whilst the rest of the country bans them from entering. Denmark also maintains a complex system of subnational countries which, unlike the Danish mainland, are outside the European Union and maintain autonomous customs policies. In addition to the numerous closed cities of Russia, parts of 19 subjects of the Russian Federation are closed for foreigners without special permits and are consequently subject to internal border controls.

Another complex border control situation in Europe pertains to the United Kingdom. Whilst the crown dependencies are within the Common Travel Area, neither Gibraltar nor the sovereign British military exclaves of Akrotiri and Dhekelia are. The former maintains its own border control policies, thus requiring physical border security at its border with the Schengen Area as well as the implementation of border controls for travellers proceeding directly between Gibraltar and the British mainland. The latter maintains a relatively open border with Southern Cyprus, though not with Northern Cyprus. Consequently, it is a de facto member of the Schengen Area and travel to or from the British mainland requires border controls. On 31 December 2020, Spain and the United Kingdom reached an agreement in principle under which Gibraltar would join the Schengen Area, clearing the way for the European Union and the UK to start formal negotiations on the matter.

In the aftermath of Brexit, border controls for goods flowing between Great Britain and Northern Ireland were introduced in accordance with the Protocol on Ireland/Northern Ireland agreed to as part of the UK's withdrawal agreement with the EU. Due to the thirty-year internecine conflict in Northern Ireland, the UK-Ireland border has had a special status since that conflict was ended by the Belfast Agreement/Good Friday Agreement of 1998. As part of the Northern Ireland Peace Process, the border has been largely invisible, without any physical barrier or custom checks on its many crossing points; this arrangement was made possible by both countries' common membership of both the EU's Single Market and Customs Union and of their Common Travel Area. Upon the UK's withdrawal from the European Union, the border in Ireland became the only land border between the UK and EU. EU single market and UK internal market provisions require certain customs checks and trade controls at their external borders. The Northern Ireland Protocol is intended to protect the EU single market, while avoiding imposition of a 'hard border' that might incite a recurrence of conflict and destabilise the relative peace that has held since the end of the Troubles. Under the Protocol, Northern Ireland is formally outside the EU single market, but EU free movement of goods rules and EU Customs Union rules still apply; this ensures there are no customs checks or controls between Northern Ireland and the rest of the island. In place of an Ireland/Northern Ireland land border, the protocol has created a de facto customs border down the Irish Sea for customs purposes, separating Northern Ireland from the island of Great Britain, to the disquiet of prominent Unionists. To operate the terms of the protocol, the United Kingdom must provide border control posts at Northern Ireland's ports: actual provision of these facilities is the responsibility of Northern Ireland's Department of Agriculture, Environment and Rural Affairs (DAERA). Temporary buildings were put in place for 1 January 2021, but in February 2021, the responsible Northern Ireland minister, Gordon Lyons (DUP), ordered officials to stop work on new permanent facilities and to stop recruiting staff for them. In its half yearly financial report 26 August 2021, Irish Continental Group, which operates ferries between Great Britain and the Republic of Ireland, expressed concern at the lack of implementation of checks on goods arriving into Northern Ireland from Great Britain, as required under the protocol. The company said that the continued absence of these checks (on goods destined for the Republic of Ireland) is causing a distortion in the level playing field, since goods that arrive directly into Republic of Ireland ports from Great Britain are checked on arrival. The implementation of border controls between Great Britain and Northern Ireland was the primary catalyst for the 2021 Northern Ireland riots.

An unusual example of internal border controls pertains to customs enforcement within the Schengen area. Even though borders are generally invisible, the existence of areas within the Schengen area but outside the European Union Value Added Tax Area, as well as jurisdictions such as Andorra which are not officially a part of the Schengen area but can not be accessed without passing through it, has resulted in the existence of sporadic internal border controls for customs purposes. Additionally, as per Schengen area rules, hotels and other types of commercial accommodation must register all foreign citizens, including citizens of other Schengen states, by requiring the completion of a registration form by their own hand.  The Schengen rules do not require any other procedures; thus, the Schengen states are free to regulate further details on the content of the registration forms, and identity documents which are to be produced, and may also require the persons exempted from registration by Schengen laws to be registered. A Schengen state is also permitted to reinstate border controls with another Schengen country for a short period where there is a serious threat to that state's "public policy or internal security" or when the "control of an external border is no longer ensured due to exceptional circumstances". When such risks arise out of foreseeable events, the state in question must notify the European Commission in advance and consult with other Schengen states. Since the implementation of the Schengen Agreement, this provision has been invoked frequently by member states, especially in response to the European migrant crisis.

Middle East
The Israeli military maintains an intricate network of internal border controls within Israeli and Palestinian territory restricting the freedom of movement of Palestinians, composed of permanent, temporary, and random manned checkpoints in the West Bank; the West Bank Barrier; and restrictions on the usage of roads by Palestinians. Spread throughout the State of Israel and the areas of the State of Palestine under de facto Israeli control, internal border control measures are a key feature of Israeli and Palestinian life and are among the most restrictive in the world. Additionally, the blockade of the Gaza Strip results in a de facto domestic customs and immigration border for Palestinians. In order to clear internal border controls, Palestinians are required to obtain a variety of permits from Israeli authorities depending on the purpose and area of their travel. The legality and impact of this network of internal border controls is controversial. B'Tselem, an Israeli non-governmental organisation that monitors human rights in Palestine, argues that they breach the rights guaranteed by the International Covenant on Economic, Social and Cultural Rights—in particular, the right to a livelihood, the right to an acceptable standard of living, the right to satisfactory nutrition, clothing, and housing, and the right to attain the best standard of physical and mental health. B'Tselem also argues that the restrictions on ill, wounded and pregnant Palestinians seeking acute medical care is in contravention of international law that states that medical professionals and the sick must be granted open passage. While Israeli Supreme Court has deemed the measures acceptable for security reasons, Haaretzs Amira Hass argues this policy defies one of the principles of the Oslo Accords, which states that Gaza and the West Bank constitute a single geographic unit.

Much like relations between Jewish settlers in Israel and the native Palestinian population, strained intercommunal relations in Northern Ireland between Irish Catholics and the descendants of Protestant settlers from England and Scotland have resulted in de facto internal checkpoints. The peace lines are an internal border security measure to separate predominantly republican and nationalist Catholic neighbourhoods from predominantly loyalist and unionist Protestant neighbourhoods. They have been in place in some form or another since the end of The Troubles in 1998, with the Good Friday Agreement. The peace lines range in length from a few hundred metres to over 5 kilometres. Some have gates in them (sometimes staffed by police) that allow passage during daylight but are closed at night.

North America

Multiple types of internal border controls exist in the United States. While the American territories of Guam and the Northern Mariana Islands follow the same visa policy as the mainland, together, they also maintain their own visa waiver programme for certain nationalities. Since the two territories are outside the customs territory of the United States, there are customs inspections when travelling between them, and the rest of the U.S. American Samoa has its own customs and immigration regulations, thus travelling between it and other American jurisdictions involves both customs and immigration inspections. The Virgin Islands are a special case, falling within the American immigration zone and solely following American visa policy, but being a customs free territory. As a result, there are no immigration checks between the two, but travellers arriving in Puerto Rico or the American mainland directly from the Virgin Islands are subject to border control for customs inspection. The United States also maintains interior checkpoints, similar to those maintained by Bhutan, along its borders with Mexico and Canada, subjecting people to border controls even after they have entered the country.

The Akwesasne nation; with territory in Ontario, Quebec, and New York; features several de facto internal border controls. As a result of protests by Akwesasne residents on their rights to cross the border unimpeded, as provided under the 1795 Jay Treaty, the Canada Border Services Agency closed its post on Cornwall Island, instead requiring travellers to proceed to the checkpoint in the city of Cornwall. As a consequence of the arrangement, residents of the island are required to clear border controls when proceeding North to the Ontarian mainland, as well as when proceeding South to Akwesasne territory in New York, thus constituting internal controls both from a Canadian perspective and from the perspective of the Akwesasne nation. Similarly, travelling between Canada and the Quebec portion of the Akwesasne nation requires driving through the state of New York, meaning that individuals will be required to clear American controls when leaving Quebec proper and to clear Canadian border controls when entering Quebec proper, though Canada does not impose border controls when entering the Quebec portion of the Akwesasne nation. Nevertheless, for residents who assert a Haudenosaunee national identity distinct from Canadian or American citizenship, the intricate network of Canadian and American border controls are seen as a foreign-imposed system of internal border controls, similar to the Israeli checkpoints in Palestinian territory.

The city of Hyder, Alaska has also been subject to internal border controls since America chose to stop regulating arrivals in Hyder from British Columbia. Since travellers exiting Hyder into Stewart, British Columbia are subject to Canadian border controls, it is theoretically possible for someone to accidentally enter Hyder from Canada without their travel documents and then to face difficulties since both America and Canada would subject them to border controls that require travel documents. At the same time, however, the northern road connecting Hyder to uninhabited mountain regions of British Columbia is equipped with neither American nor Canadian border controls, meaning that tourists from Canada proceeding northwards from Hyder are required to complete Canadian immigration formalities when they return to Stewart despite never having cleared American immigration.

Historical
Identification and freedom of internal movement have sometimes been instruments of oppression, for example in Canada's pass system, or Apartheid-era South Africa's Pass laws.

Specific requirements

The degree of strictness of border controls varies across countries and borders. In some countries, controls may be targeted at the traveller's religion, ethnicity, nationality, or other countries that have been visited. Others may need to be certain the traveller has paid the appropriate fees for their visas and has future travel planned out of the country. Yet others may concentrate on the contents of the traveller's baggage, and imported goods to ensure nothing is being carried that might bring a biosecurity risk into the country.

Biometrics

Several countries require all travellers, or all foreign travellers, to be fingerprinted on arrival and refuse admission to or arrest travellers who refuse to comply. In some countries, such as America, this may apply even to transit passengers proceeding to a third country. Many countries also require a photo be taken of people entering the country. America, which does not fully implement exit control formalities at its land frontiers (although long mandated by domestic legislation), intends to implement facial recognition for passengers departing from international airports to identify people who overstay their visa. Together with fingerprint and face recognition, iris scanning is one of three biometric identification technologies internationally standardised since 2006 by the International Civil Aviation Organization (ICAO) for use in e-passports and the United Arab Emirates conducts iris scanning on visitors who need to apply for a visa. The Department of Homeland Security has announced plans to greatly increase the biometric data it collects at American borders. In 2018, Singapore began trials of iris scanning at three land and maritime immigration checkpoints.

Immigration stamps

An immigration stamp is an inked impression in a passport or other travel document typically made by rubber stamp upon entering or exiting a territory. Depending on the jurisdiction, a stamp can serve different purposes. For example, in the United Kingdom, an immigration stamp in a passport includes the formal leave to enter granted to a person subject to entry control. In other countries, a stamp activates or acknowledges the continuing leave conferred in the passport bearer's entry clearance. Under the Schengen system, a foreign passport is stamped with a date stamp which does not indicate any duration of stay. This means that the person is deemed to have permission to remain either for three months or for the period shown on his visa if specified otherwise. Member states of the European Union are not permitted to place a stamp in the passport of a person who is not subject to immigration control. Stamping is prohibited because it is an imposition of a control to which the person is not subject. Passport stamps may occasionally take the form of sticker stamps, such as entry stamps from Japan. Depending on nationality, a visitor may not receive a stamp at all (unless specifically requested), such as an EU or EFTA citizen travelling to an EU or EFTA country, Albania, or North Macedonia. Most countries issue exit stamps in addition to entry stamps. A few countries issue only entry stamps, including Canada, El Salvador, Ireland, Mexico, New Zealand, Singapore, United Kingdom and the America. Australia, Hong Kong, Israel, Macau and South Korea do not stamp passports upon entry nor exit. These countries or regions issue landing slips instead, with the exception of Australia who do not issue any form of physical evidence of entry. Visas may also take the form of passport stamps.

Immigration authorities usually have different styles of stamps for entries and exits, to make it easier to identify the movements of people. Ink colour might be used to designate mode of transportation (air, land or sea), such as in Hong Kong prior to 1997; while border styles did the same thing in Macau. Other variations include changing the size of the stamp to indicate length of stay, as in Singapore.

In many cases passengers on cruise ships do not receive passport stamps because the entire vessel has been cleared into port. It is often possible to get a souvenir stamp, although this requires finding the immigration office by the dock. In many cases officials are used to such requests and will cooperate. Also, as noted below, some of the smallest European countries will give a stamp on request, either at their border or tourist office charging, at most, a nominal fee.

Exit controls

Whilst most countries implement border controls both at entry and exit, some jurisdictions do not. For instance, the United States and Canada do not implement exit controls at land borders and collect exit data on foreign nationals through airlines and through information sharing with neighbouring countries' entry border controls. These countries consequently don't issue exit stamps even to travellers who require stamps on entry. Similarly, Australia, Singapore and South Korea have eliminated exit stamps even though they continue to implement brief border control checks upon exit for most foreign nationals. In countries where there is no formal control by immigration officials of travel documents upon departure, exit information may be recorded by immigration authorities using the information provided to them by transport operators.

No exit control:
  United States of America
  Canada
  Mexico (by air, but entrance declaration coupon is collected)
  Bahamas
  Ireland
  United Kingdom

Formal exit control without passport stamping:
  Albania (Entry & Exit stamp may issued upon request)
  Australia (Exit stamp issued upon explicit request)
  China (Exit stamp issued upon request when using e-Gate)
  Costa Rica (only at Costa Rican airports; different entry and exit stamps are made at the border crossing with Panama)
  El Salvador
  Fiji
  Hong Kong (no entry or exit stamps are issued, instead landing slips are issued upon arrival only)
  Iran
  Israel (no entry or exit stamps are issued at Ben Gurion Airport, instead landing slips are issued upon arrival and departure)
  Japan (Exit stamp issued upon request & when not using e-Gate since July 2019)
  Macau (no entry or exit stamps are issued, instead landing slips are issued upon arrival only)
  New Zealand
  South Korea (since 1 November 2016)
  Philippines (only at Philippine Airports; At airports, red ink is applied for arrivals/entry while green is applied for departure/exit. As a general rule, passports of all travelers regardless of their nationality (including Philippine passport holders), need to be stamped at both entry and exit points. The attending officer also writes down the flight number and stamps the passenger's boarding pass upon departure with the same stamp that is used for departure different entry and exit stamp.  The shape and/or designs of the stamps are changed every five to six years. Recently, Philippine passport holders may opt to arrive via E-gate, wherein a sticker will be printed and must be placed on the passport. The sticker contains name, passport number, flight number, terminal of arrival, and date of arrival and time.
  Panama (only at Panamanian airports; stamps are made at the border crossing with Costa Rica)
  Republic of China (exit stamp issued upon request & when not using e-Gate)
  Singapore (no exit stamps since 22 April 2019)
  Saint Kitts and Nevis
  Schengen Area countries (when the Entry Exit System becomes operational in 2022, it is anticipated that the passports of third-country nationals will not be stamped when they enter and leave the Schengen Area)

Exit permits
Some countries in Europe maintain controversial exit visa systems in addition to regular border controls. For instance, Uzbekistan requires its own citizens to obtain exit visas prior to leaving for countries other than fellow CIS nations in eastern Europe. Several countries in the Arabian peninsula require exit visas for foreign workers under the Kafala System meaning "sponsorship system"). Russia occasionally requires foreigners who overstay to obtain exit visas since one cannot exit Russia without a valid visa. Czechia has a similar policy. Similarly, a foreign citizen granted a temporary residence permit in Russia needs an exit visa to take a trip abroad (valid for both exit and return). Not all foreign citizens are subject to that requirement. Citizens of Germany, for example, do not require this exit visa. During the Cold War, countries in the Eastern Bloc maintained strict controls on citizens' ability to travel abroad. Citizens of the Soviet Union, East Germany, and other communist states were typically required to obtain permission prior to engaging in international travel. Unlike most of these states, citizens of Yugoslavia enjoyed a significant freedom of international movement.

Certain Asian countries have policies that similarly require certain categories of citizens to seek official authorisation prior to travelling or emigrating. This is usually either as a way to enforce national service obligations or to protect migrant workers from travelling to places where they may be abused by employers. Singapore, for instance, operates an Exit Permit scheme in order to enforce the national service obligations of its male citizens and permanent residents. These restrictions vary according to age and status. South Korea and Taiwan have similar policies. India, on the other hand, requires citizens who have not met certain educational requirements (and thus may be targeted by human traffickers or be coerced into modern slavery) to apply for approval prior to leaving the country and endorses their passports with "Emigration Check Required". Nepal similarly requires citizens emigrating to America on an H-1B visa to present an exit permit issued by the Ministry of Labour. This document is called a work permit and needs to be presented to immigration to leave the country. In a bid to increase protection for the large amount of Indian, Bangladeshi, Chinese, and Nepali citizens smuggled through Indian airports to the Middle East as underpaid labourers, many Indian airline companies require travellers to obtain an 'OK to Board' confirmation sent directly from visa authorities in certain GCC countries directly to the airline and will bar anyone who has not obtained this endorsement from clearing exit immigration.

Eritrea requires the vast majority of its citizens to apply for special authorisation if they wish to leave, or even travel within, the country.

Travel documents

Border control policies typically require travellers to present valid travel documents in order to ascertain their identity, nationality or permanent residence status, and eligibility to enter a given jurisdiction. The most common form of travel document is the passport, a booklet-form identity document issued by national authorities or the governments of certain subnational territories containing an individual's personal information as well as space for the authorities of other jurisdictions to affix stamps, visas, or other permits authorising the bearer to enter, reside, or travel within their territory. Certain jurisdictions permit individuals to clear border controls using identity cards, which typically contain similar personal information.

Visas

A visa is a travel document issued to foreign nationals enabling them to clear border controls. They traditionally take the form of an adhesive sticker or, occasionally, a stamp affixed to a page in an individual's passport or equivalent document. Visas policies different purposes depending on the priorities of each jurisdiction, ranging from ensuring that visitors do not pose a national security risk or have sufficient financial resources to simply functioning as a tax on tourists, as is the case with countries like Mauritius and other leisure destinations which issue visas on arrival, electronic visas, or electronic travel authorisations (ETAs) to most or all visitors. Visas may include limits on the duration of the foreigner's stay, areas within the state they may enter, the dates they may enter, the number of permitted visits, or an individual's right to work in the state in question.

Many countries in Asia have liberalised their visa controls in recent years to encourage transnational business and tourism. For example, India, Myanmar, and Sri Lanka have introduced electronic visas to make border control less arduous for business travellers and tourists. Malaysia has introduced similar eVisa facilities, and has also introduced the eNTRI programme to expedite clearance for Indian citizens and Chinese citizens from the mainland. Thailand regularly issues visas on arrival to many non-exempt visitors at major ports of entry in order to encourage tourism. Indonesia, in recent years, has progressively liberalised its visa regime, no longer requiring visas or on-arrival visas from most nationals, while Singapore has signed visa waiver agreements with many countries in recent years and has introduced electronic visa facilities for Indians, Eastern Europeans, and mainland Chinese. This trend towards visa liberalisation in Asia is part of the regional trend toward social and economic globalisation that has been linked to heightened economic growth.

Certain countries, predominantly but not exclusively in western Europe and the Americas, issue working holiday visas for younger visitors to supplement their travel funds by working minor jobs. These are especially common in members of the European Union, and elsewhere in Europe.

Saudi Arabia issues a special category visa for people on religious pilgrimage. Similar policies are in force in other countries with significant religious sites.

Certain jurisdictions impose special visa requirements on journalists. Countries that require such visas include Cuba, China, North Korea, Saudi Arabia, America and Zimbabwe.

As a consequence of awkward border situations created by the fall of the Soviet Union, certain former members of the USSR and their neighbours maintain special visa exemption policies for travellers transiting across international boundaries between two points in a single country. For instance, Russia permits vehicles to transit across the Saatse Boot between the Estonian villages of Lutepää and Sesniki without any visa or border checkpoint provided that they do not stop. Similar provisions are made for the issuance of Facilitated Rail Transit Documents by Schengen Area members for travel between Kaliningrad Oblast and the Russian mainland, enabling Russian citizens to travel to and from the exclave without a passport or visa.

Many countries let individuals clear border controls using foreign visas. Notably, the Philippines permits nationals of India and China can use any of several foreign visas to clear border controls. In order to encourage tourism by transit passengers, South Korea permits passengers in transit who would otherwise require a South Korean visa to enter for up to thirty days utilising an Australian, Canadian, American, or Schengen visa. Uniquely, the British territory of Bermuda has ceased to issue its own visas and instead requires that travellers either clear immigration visa-free in one of the three countries (Canada, America, and United Kingdom) to/from which it has direct flights, or hold a visa for one of them.

Electronic visas and electronic travel authorisations

Beginning in the 2000s, many countries introduced e-visas and electronic travel authorisations (ETAs) as an alternative to traditional visas. An ETA is a kind of pre-arrival registration, which may or may not be officially classified as a visa depending on the issuing jurisdiction, required for foreign travellers who are exempted from obtaining a full visa. In contrast to the procedures that typically apply in regard to proper visas, per which the traveller normally has no recourse if rejected, if an ETA is rejected the traveller can choose to apply for a visa instead. In contrast, an e-visa is simply a visa that travellers can apply for and receive online without visiting the issuing state's consular mission or visa agency. The following jurisdictions require certain categories of international travellers to hold an ETA or e-visa in order to clear border controls upon arrival:
 Australia:
 Electronic Travel Authority (ETA)
 eVisitor programme
 East African Community: From February 2014, Kenya, Rwanda and Uganda issue an East African Tourist Visa.
 Hong Kong: Mainland Travel Permit for Taiwan Residents
 India: India permits nationals of most jurisdictions to clear border controls using an e-visa.
 Kenya: From 1 January 2021, Kenya solely issues e-visas and physical visas are no longer available.
 New Zealand: Electronic Travel Authority (NZeTA)
 North America: Canadian ETA, US Electronic System for Travel Authorisation
 Pakistan: Pakistani ETA.
 South Korea: eligible visa-free visitors must obtain Korea Electronic Travel Authorization (K-ETA).
 Sri Lanka: Sri Lankan ETA
 Qatar: ETA needed for up to 30 days.
 United Kingdom: Electronic Visa Waiver, or EVW The Nationality and Borders Bill, before the parliament in Spring 2022, includes a proposal to introduce the Electronic Travel Authorisation system for all non-UK and Irish citizens.

Nationality and travel history
Many nations implement border controls restricting the entry of people of certain nationalities or who have visited certain countries. For instance Georgia refuses entry to holders of passports issued by the Republic of China. Similarly, since April 2017, nationals of Bangladesh, Pakistan, Sudan, Syria, Yemen, and Iran have been banned from entering the parts of eastern Libya under the control of the Tobruk government. The majority of Arab countries, as well as Iran and Malaysia, ban Israeli citizens, however exceptional entry to Malaysia is possible with approval from the Ministry of Home Affairs. Certain countries may also restrict entry to those with Israeli stamps or visas in their passports. As a result of tension over the Artsakh dispute, Azerbaijan currently forbids entry to Armenian citizens as well as to individuals with proof of travel to Artsakh.

Between September 2017 and January 2021, America did not issue new visas to nationals of Iran, North Korea, Libya, Somalia, Syria, or Yemen pursuant to restrictions imposed by the Trump administration, which were subsequently repealed by the Biden administration on 20 January 2021. While in force, the restrictions were conditional and could be lifted if the countries affected meet the required security standards specified by the Trump administration, and dual citizens of these countries could still enter if they presented a passport from a non-designated country.

Prescreening
A significant number of countries maintain prescreening facilities for passengers departing from other jurisdictions to clear border controls prior to arrival and thereby skip checkpoints upon arrival. Aside from simplifying arrival formalities, this enables border control authorities to deny entry to potentially inadmissible travellers prior to their embarking and to reduce congestion at border checkpoints located at ports of arrival.
 Hong Kong and Mainland China: There are two border crossings between Hong Kong and the Chinese mainland at which border controls imposed by the two jurisdictions are colocated:
 West Kowloon Railway Station: A component of the Guangzhou–Shenzhen–Hong Kong Express Rail Link, West Kowloon Station contains a "Mainland Port Area", essentially enabling passengers and goods to clear mainland Chinese immigration on Hong Kong soil.
 Shenzhen Bay Port: The land border checkpoint at Shenzhen Bay Port in the mainland contains a Hong Kong Port Area which enables passengers and goods to clear Hong Kong border controls in the mainland. The checkpoint is located in the Chinese mainland on land leased from the city of Shenzhen in Guangdong province. By enabling travellers to clear both Chinese and Hong Kong border controls in one place, it eliminates any need for a second checkpoint on the Hong Kong side of the Shenzhen Bay Bridge.

 Singapore and Malaysia:
 Woodlands Train Checkpoint: For cross-border rail passengers, Singaporean exit and Malaysian entry preclearance border controls are co-located at the Woodlands Train Checkpoint in Singapore, whilst Malaysian exit controls are located separately at Johor Bahru Sentral railway station in Malaysia.
 Johor Bahru – Singapore Rapid Transit System (RTS): The upcoming RTS connecting Singapore and Johor Bahru will feature border control preclearance both on the Singaporean side and on the Malaysian side. This will enable passengers arriving in Singapore from Malaysia or vice versa to proceed straight to their connecting transport, since the RTS will link to both the Singapore MRT system (Thomson-East Coast MRT Line) and Johor Bahru Sentral. Unlike the preclearance systems adopted in America and Hong Kong, but similar to the United Kingdom's juxtaposed controls, this system will mitigate arrival border controls on both sides of the border.
 Malaysia and Thailand:
 Padang Besar railway station: The Padang Besar railway station in Padang Besar, Malaysia has co-located border control facilities for both Malaysia and Thailand, although the station is wholly located inside Malaysian territory (albeit just 200 metres south of the Malaysia-Thailand border). The facilities for each country operate from separate counters inside the railway station building at the platform level. Passengers entering Thailand clear Malaysian and Thai border formalities here in Malaysian territory before boarding their State Railway of Thailand trains which then cross the actual borderline several minutes after departing the station. Passengers from Thailand entering Malaysia are also processed here, using the same counters as there are no separate counters for processing entries and exits for either country.
 United Kingdom and the Schengen Area: Border control for travel between the United Kingdom and the Schengen Area features significant prescreening under the juxtaposed controls programme for travel both by ferry and rail. This includes customs and immigration prescreening on both sides of the Channel Tunnel, and immigration-only prescreening for ferry passengers and on the Eurostar between the United Kingdom and stations located in Belgium, France, and the Netherlands. Eurostar and Eurotunnel passengers departing from the Schengen area go through both French, Dutch, or Belgian exit border control and British entry border controls before departures, while passengers departing from the United Kingdom, including those departing for Belgium or the Netherlands, undergo French border controls on British soil. For travel by ferry, French entry border control for ferries between Dover and Calais or Dunkerque takes place at the Port of Dover, whilst French exit and British entry border control takes place at Calais and Dunkerque. For travel by rail, twelve juxtaposed border control checkpoints are currently in operation.

 United States: The U.S. government operates border preclearance facilities at a number of ports and airports in foreign territory. They are staffed and operated by U.S. Customs and Border Protection officers. Travellers pass through the U.S. Immigration and Customs, Public Health, and Agriculture inspections before boarding their aircraft, ship, or train. This process is intended to streamline border procedures, reduce congestion at ports of entry, and facilitate travel between the preclearance location and American airports unequipped to handle international travellers. These facilities are present at the majority of major Canadian airports, as well as selected airports in Bermuda, Aruba, the Bahamas, Abu Dhabi and Ireland. Facilities located in Canada accept NEXUS cards and United States Passport cards (land/sea entry only) in lieu of passports. A preclearance facility is currently being planned at Dubai International Airport. Citizens of the Bahamas who enter United States through either of the two preclearance facilities in that country enjoy an exemption from the general requirement to hold a visa as long as they can sufficiently prove that they do not have a significant criminal record in either the Bahamas or the U.S. All Bahamians applying for admission at a port-of-entry other than the preclearance facilities located in Nassau or Freeport International airports are required to be in possession of a valid visa. Preclearance facilities are also operated at Pacific Central Station, the Port of Vancouver, and the Port of Victoria in British Columbia, and there are plans to open one at Montreal Central Station in Quebec.

 Informal prescreening: In some cases countries can introduce controls that function as border controls but aren't border controls legally and don't need to be performed by government agencies. Normally they are performed and organised by private companies, based on a law that they have to check that passengers don't travel into a specific country if they aren't allowed to. Such controls can take effect in one country based on the law of another country without any formalised border control prescreening agreement in force. Even if they aren't border controls function as such. The most prominent example is airlines which check passports and visas before passengers are allowed to board the aircraft. Also for some passenger boats, such checks are performed before boarding.

Expedited border controls

Certain countries and trade blocs establish programmes for high-frequency and/or low risk travellers to expedite border controls, subjecting them to lighter or automated checks, or priority border control facilities. In some countries, citizens or residents have access to automated facilities not available to foreigners. The following expedited border control programmes are currently in effect:
 APEC Business Travel Card (ABTC): The APEC Business Travel Card, or ABTC, is an expedited border control programme for business travellers from APEC economies (excluding Canada and America). It provides visa exemptions and access to expedited border control facilities. ABTC holders are eligible for expedited border control at Canadian airports but not for any visa exemptions. ABTCs are generally issued only to citizens of APEC member countries, however Hong Kong issues them to Permanent Residents who are not Chinese citizens, a category primarily consisting of British, Indian, and Pakistani citizens. The use of ABTCs in China is restricted as a result of the One Country, Two Systems and One China policies. Chinese nationals from Hong Kong, Macau, and the Republic of China are required to use special internal travel documents to enter the mainland. Similar restrictions exist on the use of ABTC for Chinese citizens of other regions entering areas administered by the Republic of China. (see: Internal border controls).
 : SmartGates located at major Australian airports allow Australian ePassport holders and ePassport holders of a number of other countries to clear immigration controls more rapidly, and to enhance travel security by performing passport control checks electronically. SmartGate uses facial recognition system to verify the traveller's identity against the data stored in the chip in their biometric passport, as well as checking against immigration databases. Travellers require a biometric passport to use SmartGate as it uses information from the passport (such as photograph, name and date of birth) and in the respective countries' databases (i.e. banned travellers database) to decide whether to grant entry or departure from Australia or to generate a referral to a customs agent. These checks would otherwise require manual processing by a human which is time-consuming, costly and potentially error-prone.
  British Isles: ePassport gates in the British Isles are operated by the UK Border Force and the Irish Naturalisation and Immigration Service, and are located at immigration checkpoints in the arrival halls of some airports across the British Isles, offering an alternative to using desks staffed by immigration officers. The gates use facial recognition system to verify the user's identity by comparing the user's facial features to those recorded in the photograph stored in the chip in their biometric passport. British citizens, European Economic Area citizens and citizens of Australia, Canada, Japan, New Zealand, Singapore, South Korea, Taiwan and America as well as Chinese citizens of Hong Kong who are enrolled in the Registered Traveller Service, can use ePassport gates at 14 ports of entry in the United Kingdom provided that they are aged either 18 and over or 12 and over travelling with an adult and holding valid biometric passports. In Ireland, eGates are available at Dublin Airport for arrivals at Terminal 1 (Piers 1 and 2) and Terminal 2 and, in addition to Irish and British citizens, they are currently available to citizens of Switzerland and the European Economic Area with electronic passports aged 18 or over though there are proposals to extend the service to non-European citizens. Irish Passport Cards can not be used at eGates.
 : CARIPASS is a voluntary travel card programme that will provide secure and simple border crossings for citizens and legal residents of participating Caribbean Community jurisdictions. The CARIPASS initiative is coordinated by the Implementation Agency for Crime and Security (CARICOM IMPACS), and seeks to provide standardised border control facilities within participating Caribbean communities. CARIPASS is accepted as a valid travel document within and between participating member states and will allow cardholders to access automated gate facilities at immigration checkpoints that will use biometric technology to verify the user.
 China:
  Mainland China: Residents in the PRC, both Chinese citizens and foreign residents (not tourists) can use the Chinese E-Channel after registration, which is done at the border, before leaving the Mainland. Chinese citizens with Hong Kong or Macau Permanent Residence can use their Home Return Permit instead of their passport to enter and leave the Mainland.
  Hong Kong & Macau: The Automated Passenger Clearance System, colloquially known as the e-Channel) is an automated border control facility available at airports in Hong Kong and Macau, and at land borders between the mainland and the Special Administrative Regions. It is open to residents in the appropriate regions, and to selected foreign nationals. Finally, Hong Kong's and Macau's  systems recognise each other's Permanent Resident ID card, after registration in an automated kiosk at the ferry terminal.
 : Along with the introduction of J-BIS, an "Automated gate" was set up at Terminal 1 and 2 at Narita Airport, Haneda Airport, Chubu Centrair Airport and Kansai Airport. With this system, when a person enters or leaves the country, rather than having to be processed by an examiner there, a person can use a machine at the gate, thereby making both entry and departure simpler and easier, as well as more convenient. Japanese people with valid passports, foreigners with both valid passports (this includes refugees with valid travel certificates and re-entry permits) and re-entry permits can use this system.
 : Viajero Confiable is a Mexican trusted traveller programme which allows members to pass securely through customs and immigration controls in reduced time, using automated kiosks at participating airports. Viajero Confiable was introduced in three airports in 2014 and has since expanded to additional sites. Like the NEXUS, Global Entry, and TSA PreCheck programs, Viajero Confiable members traveling via participating airports may use designated lanes which allow them to speedily and securely clear customs, because the Mexican government has already performed a background check on them, and they are considered a trusted traveller. At the participating airports, members may use automated kiosks to scan their passport and fingerprints, and complete an electronic immigration form. The programme is targeted at Mexican citizens, as well as U.S. or Canadian citizens who are members of the Global Entry or NEXUS programme and are lawful permanent residents of Mexico.
 : In New Zealand, a SmartGate system exists at Auckland, Wellington, Christchurch and Queenstown airports, enabling holders of biometric passports issued by New Zealand, Australia, Canada, China, France, Germany, Ireland and the Netherlands, the United Kingdom, and America to clear border controls using automated facilities. The system can currently only be used by travellers 12 years of age or older, however a trial is under way that may potentially lower the age of eligibility to use eGate for people with an eligible ePassport from 12 years of age to 10 years of age. New Zealand eGates utilise biometric technology, comparing the picture of your face in your ePassport with the picture it takes of you at the gate in order to confirm your identity. To make sure eGate can do this, travellers must make sure they look as similar to their ePassport photos as possible and remove glasses, scarves and hats that they were not wearing when their passport picture was taken. eGate can handle minor changes in your face, for example if the travellers' weight or hair has changed. Customs, Biosecurity and Immigration officials utilise information provided at eGates, including photos, to clear travellers and their items across New Zealand's border. Biometric information is kept for three months before destruction but other information, including about movements across New Zealand's border is kept indefinitely and handled in accordance with the Privacy Act 1993, or as the law authorises. This might include information being used by or shared with other law enforcement or border control authorities. Since 1 July 2019, visitors from the 60 Visa Waiver countries require a New Zealand electronic Travel Authority (NZeTA). This is an online application and a further toolkit and requirements for airlines and travel agents can be downloaded from the New Zealand Immigration website.
 : The enhanced-Immigration Automated Clearance System is available at all checkpoints for Singapore citizens, permanent residents, foreign residents with long-term passes, APEC Business Travel Card holders, and other registered travellers. Foreign visitors whose fingerprints are registered on arrival may use the  lanes for exit clearance. In addition, the Biometric Identification of Motorbikers (BIKES) System is available for eligible motorcyclists at the land border crossings with Malaysia. Additionally, nationals of certain countries may register to use the  system on entry, provided they meet prescribed conditions.
 : South Korea maintains a programme known as the Smart Entry Service, open for registration by South Koreans aged 7 or above and by registered foreigners aged 17 or above. Furthermore, visitors aged 17 or older may use the Smart Entry Service on exit at international airports, as long as they have provided their biometrics on arrival.
  Taiwan: An automated entry system, eGate, exists in areas administered by the Republic of China providing expedited border control for ROC nationals as well as certain classes of residents and frequent visitors. Users simply scan their travel documents at the gate and are passed through for facial recognition. As of 2019, there have been instances of foreign non-registered travellers allowed to use the eGate system to depart, notably at Taipei Taoyuan Airport Terminal 1, but not Terminal 2, using a passport scan and fingerprints.
 : The automated passport control (APC) system, which uses a facial recognition system, has been available for Thai nationals since 2012 and more than 20 million have used it. Suvarnabhumi Airport opened 8 automated immigration lanes for foreigners, but only Singaporeans were allowed to use the system initially. Since then, Singaporeans and holders of the Hong Kong SAR passport have been allowed to use the system. Once processed, the foreign travellers can leave the automatic channel and present their passport to a Thai immigration officer to be stamped.
 North America: North America has a wide variety of expedited border control programmes:
  Global Entry: Global Entry is a programme for frequent travellers that enables them to utilise automated border control facilities and priority security screening. In addition to U.S. citizens and Permanent Residents, the programme is open to Indian, Singaporean, and South Korean citizens among others. Global Entry members are eligible to use automated Global Entry facilities at certain airports to clear border control more efficiently. Enrolled users must present their machine-readable passport or permanent residency card, and submit their fingerprints to establish identity. Users then complete an electronic customs declaration, and are issued a receipt instructing them to either proceed to baggage claim, or to a normal inspection booth for an interview. Participants may utilise automated kiosks to clear U.S. border controls at participating airports.
  CANPASS: Canadian citizens and Permanent Residents can apply for CANPASS which, in its present form, provides expedited border controls for individuals entering Canada on corporate and private aircraft.
   NEXUS and FAST: NEXUS is a joint Canadian-U.S. expedited border control programme for low risk travellers holding Canadian or U.S. citizenship or permanent residence. Membership requires approval by Canadian and U.S. authorities and entitles members to dedicated RFID-enabled lanes when crossing the land border. A NEXUS card can also be utilised as a travel document between the two countries and entitles passengers to priority border control facilities in Canada and Global Entry facilities in the U.S. Free and Secure Trade (FAST) is a similar programme for commercial drivers and approved importers, reducing the amount of customs checks conducted at the border and expediting the border control process. When entering the U.S. by air, holders of NEXUS cards may use Global Entry kiosks to clear border controls at participating airports
  SENTRI: SENTRI is a programme similar to NEXUS for U.S. and Mexican citizens that additionally allows members to register their cars for expedited land border controls. Unlike NEXUS, SENTRI is administered solely by the American government and does not provide expedited controls when entering Mexico. When entering United States by land from Canada, it can be used as a NEXUS card, but not the other way around. Individuals holding a NEXUS card may additionally register their cars for expedited land border controls under SENTRI. When entering United States by air, holders of SENTRI cards may use Global Entry kiosks to clear border controls at participating airports
  TSA PreCheck: TSA PreCheck is a trusted traveller programme initiated in December 2013 and administered by the U.S. Transportation Security Administration that allows selected members of select frequent flyer programs, members of Global Entry, NEXUS, and SENTRI, members of the armed forces, and cadets and midshipmen of the United States service academies After completing a background check, being fingerprinted, and paying an $85 fee, travellers will get a Known Traveler Number. TSA does not issue an ID card like Global Entry, NEXUS, and SENTRI do. Travelers are notified if they have PreCheck by having an indicator printed on their boarding pass that may say "TSAPRECHK", "TSA PRE", or "TSA Pre✓®" depending on the airline and type of boarding pass. As of December 2019, a total of 73 airlines were participating in the program.
 Local border traffic is the flow of travellers within the area surrounding a controlled international or internal border. In many cases local border traffic is subject to special regulations to expedite border controls for individuals travelling within local border areas. Depending on the particular border in question, these measures may be restricted to local residents, implemented as a blanket regional visa waiver by one jurisdiction for nationals of the other, restricted to frequent cross-border travellers, or available to individuals lawfully present in one jurisdiction seeking to visit the other.
 : For example, the relaxed border controls maintained by Bhutan for those not proceeding past Phuentsholing and certain other border cities enable travellers to enter without going through any document check whatsoever.
  America: The Border Crossing Card issued by American authorities to Mexican nationals enables Mexicans to enter border areas without a passport. Both United States and Bhutan maintain interior checkposts to enforce compliance.
 : China maintains relaxed border controls for individuals lawfully in Hong Kong or Macau to visit the surrounding Pearl River Delta visa-free provided that certain conditions are met.
  The "Brest – Grodno" visa free territory, established by a presidential decree signed in August 2019 has permitted local visa free access to most visitors lawfully present in the neighbouring Schengen Area since 10 November 2019. Visitors are allowed to stay without a visa for 15 days. Entry is possible through designated checkpoints with Poland and Lithuania, Brest-Uschodni Railway Station, Grodno Railway Station, Brest Airport and Grodno Airport. Prior to travel, visitors must obtain authorisation from a local travel agency in Belarus.
  Schengen Area: Schengen states which share an external land border with a non-Schengen state are authorised by EU Regulation 1931/2006 to conclude bilateral agreements with neighbouring countries implementing a simplified local border traffic regime. Such agreements define a border area and provide for the issuance of local border traffic permits to residents of the border area that may be used to cross the EU external border within the border area.

Border control organisations by country

Border control is generally the responsibility of specialised government organisations which oversee various aspects their jurisdiction's border control policies, including customs, immigration policy, border security, biosecurity measures. Official designations, division of responsibilities, and command structures of these organisations vary considerably and some countries split border control functions across multiple agencies.

Australian Border Force

Immigration, Refugees and Citizenship Canada
Canada Border Services Agency (previously Canada Customs and Revenue Agency)
Canadian Air Transport Security Authority

National Immigration Administration of Ministry of Public Security
People's Armed Police
General Administration of Customs
 Immigration Department (Hong Kong)
 Public Security Police Force of Macau

Border Security Force
The Assam Rifles
Indo-Tibetan Border Police

Directorate General of Immigration (Indonesia)

Irish Naturalisation and Immigration Service
Garda National Immigration Bureau
Revenue Commissioners

 The Immigration & Passport Police Office, a subdivision of Law Enforcement Force of Islamic Republic of Iran
 Islamic Republic of Iran Border Guard Command ("NAJA Border Guard"), a subdivision of Law Enforcement Force of Islamic Republic of Iran

Immigration Department of Malaysia

Border Security Command
Coastal Security Bureau

Pakistan Rangers
Frontier Corps
Gilgit−Baltistan Scouts
Pakistan Army
Pakistan Rangers
Pakistan Customs
Schengen Area
European Border and Coast Guard Agency (Frontex)
 
Direction centrale de la police aux frontières (a directorate of the French National Police)
Direction générale des douanes et droits indirects (DGDDI)

Finnish Border Guard
Finnish Customs

Federal Police
Bundeszollverwaltung
 
Polizia di Stato
Guardia di Finanza
Arma dei Carabinieri
 
Koninklijke Marechaussee (English: Royal Military Constabulary), a branch of the Dutch Armed Forces
Fiscal Information and Investigation Service
  
 Cuerpo Nacional de Policia
 Guardia Civil
 Customs Surveillance Service
  
Federal Department of Justice and Police
Federal Office of Police
Federal Department of Finance
Swiss Border Guard
  
Swedish Border Police

Korean Immigration Service, Ministry of Justice
Korea Customs Service 

Immigration and Checkpoints Authority

National Immigration Agency
 Customs Administration

HM Revenue and Customs
UK Border Force
Immigration Enforcement

Department of Homelend Security (DHS)
U.S. Customs and Border Protection (CBP), a division of the DHS
United States Border Patrol 
Transport Security Administration
U.S. Immigration and Customs Enforcement, or ICE
United States Citizenship and Immigration Services

Controversies
Certain border control policies of various countries have been the subject of controversy and public debate.

  Australia:
 Offshore detention centres: Beginning in 2001, Australia implemented border control policies featuring the detention of asylum seekers and economic migrants who arrived unlawfully by boat in nearby islands in the Pacific. These policies are controversial and in 2017 the Supreme Court of Papua New Guinea declared the detention centre at Manus Island to be unconstitutional. The adherence of these policies to international human rights law is a matter of controversy.
 Travel restrictions on Australian citizens during the COVID-19 pandemic: During the COVID-19 pandemic, Australia adopted a policy of denying entry to its own citizens arriving from jurisdictions perceived to pose a high risk of COVID-19 transmission. Additionally, Australia adopted a broad policy of restricting entry to the country for all individuals located overseas, including Australian citizens, resulting in a large number of Australian citizens stranded abroad. Australia's policies with regard to its own citizens undermined the principle in international law that a state must permit entry to its own citizens, as enshrined in the International Covenant on Civil and Political Rights. At the same time, the Australian government prohibited the majority of Australian citizens from exiting the country, even if they ordinarily reside overseas.

  Bhutan: Starting primarily in the 1990s, the Bhutanese government implemented strict restrictions on the country's ethnically Nepali Lhotshampa population and implemented internal border control policies to restrict immigration or return of ethnic Nepalis, creating a refugee crisis. This policy shift effectively ended previously liberal immigration policies with regards to Nepalis and counts among the most racialised border control policies in Asia.
  China: China does not currently recognise North Korean defectors as refugees and subjects them to immediate deportation if caught. The China-DPRK border is fortified and both sides aim to deter refugees from crossing. This aspect of Chinese border control policy has been criticised by human rights organisations.
  Cyprus: As a result of Northern Cyprus's sovereignty dispute with Southern Cyprus, the South (a member of the European Union) has imposed restrictions on the North's airports, and pressure from the European Union has resulted in all countries other than Turkey recognising the South's ability to impose a border shutdown on the North, thus negating the right to self determination of the predominantly Turkish Northern Cypriot population and subjecting their airports to border controls imposed by the predominantly Greek South. As a result, Northern Cyprus is heavily dependent on Turkey for economic support and is unable to develop a functioning economy.
  Israel: Border control, both on entry and on exit, at Israeli airports rate passengers' potential threat to security using factors including nationality, ethnicity, and race. Instances of discrimination against Arabs, people perceived to be Muslim, and Russian Jews among others have been reported in the media. Security at Tel Aviv's Ben Gurion Airport relies on a number of fundamentals, including a heavy focus on what Raphael Ron, former director of security at Ben Gurion, terms the "human factor", which he generalised as "the inescapable fact that terrorist attacks are carried out by people who can be found and stopped by an effective security methodology." As part of its focus on this so-called "human factor", Israeli security officers interrogate travellers, profiling those who appear to be Arab based on name or physical appearance. Even as Israeli authorities argue that racist, ethnic, and religious profiling are effective security measures, according to Boaz Ganor, Israel has not undertaken any known empirical studies on the efficacy of the technique of racial profiling.

  United States
 Policies targeting Muslims: Since the implementation of added security measures in the aftermath of the 2001 World Trade Centre attacks, reports of discrimination against people perceived to be Muslim by American border security officers have been prevalent in the media. The travel restrictions implemented during the Trump presidency primarily against Muslim majority countries have provoked controversy over whether such measures are a legitimate Border security measure or unethically discriminatory.
 Separation of families seeking asylum: In April 2018, as part of its "zero tolerance" policy, the American government ordered the separation of the children of refugees and asylum seekers from their parents. As a consequence of popular outrage, and criticism from the medical and religious communities, the policy was put on hold by an executive order signed by Trump on 20 June 2018. Under the policy, federal authorities separated children from their parents, relatives, or other adults who accompanied them in crossing the border, whether apprehended during an illegal crossing or, in numerous reported cases, legally presenting themselves for asylum. The policy involved prosecuting all adults detained at the Mexican border, imprisoning parents, and handing minors to the American Department of Health and Human Services. The federal government reported that the policy resulted in the separation of over 2300 children from their parents. The Trump administration blamed Congress for the atrocity and labelled the change in policy as "the Democrats' law", even though Congress had been overwhelmingly dominated by Republicans since 2016. Regardless, members of both parties criticised the policy and detractors of the Trump administration emphasise the fact there does not seem to be any written law that required the government to implement such a policy. Attorney General Jeff Sessions, in defending the policy, quoted a passage from the Bible, notwithstanding the fact that religious doctrine carries absolutely no weight in American law. Other officials praised the policy as a deterrent to unlawful immigration. The costs of separating migrant children from their parents and keeping them in "tent cities" are higher than keeping them with their parents in detention centres. To handle the large amount of immigration charges brought by the Trump administration, federal prosecutors had to divert resources from other crime cases. It costs $775 per person per night to house the children when they are separated but $256 per person per night when they are held in permanent HHS facilities and $298 per person per night to keep the children with their parents in immigration detention centres. The head of the Justice Department's major crimes unit in San Diego diverted staff from drug smuggling cases. Drug smuggling cases were also increasingly pursued in state courts rather than federal courts, as federal prosecutor were increasingly preoccupied with pursuing charges against illegal border crossings. The Kaiser Family Foundation said that costs associated with the policy may also divert resources from programmes within the Department of Health and Human Services. In July 2018, it was reported that HHS had diverted at least $40 million from its health programs to care for and reunify migrant children, and that the HHS was preparing to shift more than $200 million from other HHS accounts.

Gallery

See also 
 Asylum seeker
 Border barrier
 Airspace
 Air sovereignty
 Illegal entry
 United States Border Patrol
 Border guard
 Illegal immigration
 Immigration law
 Maritime boundary
 Freedom of movement
 Refugees

Notes

References

Further reading 

 Susan Harbage Page & Inéz Valdez (17 April 2011). "Residues of Border Control", Southern Spaces
 
 Philippe Legrain (2007). Immigrants: Your Country Needs Them, Little Brown, 
 Aristide Zolberg (2006). A Nation by Design: Immigration Policy in the Fashioning of America, Harvard University Press, 
 Philippe Legrain (2007). Immigrants: Your Country Needs Them, Little Brown, 
 Ruben Rumbaut & Walter Ewing (Spring 2007). "The Myth of Immigrant Criminality and the Paradox of Assimilation: Incarceration Rates among Native and Foreign-Born Men", The Immigration Policy Center.
 Bryan Balin (2008). State Immigration Legislation and Immigrant Flows: An Analysis The Johns Hopkins University
 Douglas S. Massey (September 2005). "Beyond the Border Buildup: Towards a New Approach to Mexico-U.S. Migration", Immigration Policy Center, the American Immigration Law Foundation
 IPC Special Report (November 2005). "Economic Growth & Immigration: Bridging the Demographic Divide", Immigration Policy Center, the American Immigration Law Foundation
 American Immigration Council (April 2014). "Immigrant Women in the United States: A Demographic Portrait"
 Jill Esbenshade (Summer 2007). "Division and Dislocation: Regulating Immigration through Local Housing Ordinances". American Immigration Council
 Jeffrey S. Passel & Roberto Suro (September 2005). "Rise, Peak and Decline: Trends in U.S. Immigration". Pew Hispanic Center
 Jeffrey S. Passel (March 2005). "Estimates of the Size and Characteristics of the Undocumented Population". Pew Hispanic Center
 Jeffrey S. Passel (March 2007). "Growing Share of Immigrants Choosing Naturalization". Pew Hispanic Center
 
 UNCTAD's Classification of Non-Tariff Measures (2012) report

External links
 ITC's Market Access Map, an online database of customs tariffs and market requirements.

Border control
Control
Export and import control
International relations
Control
International law
Travel
Visas